= List of stars in Leo =

This is the list of notable stars in the constellation Leo, sorted by decreasing brightness.

Name	B	F	G.	Var	HD	HIP	RA	Dec	vis. mag.	abs. mag.	Dist. (ly)	Sp. class	Notes
Regulus	α	32			87901	49669	10^{h} 08^{m} 22.46^{s}	+11° 58′ 01.9″	1.36	−0.52	77	B7V	Cor Leonis, Qalb, Kabelaced, Qalb al-Asad, Rex
Denebola	β	94			102647	57632	11^{h} 49^{m} 03.88^{s}	+14° 34′ 20.4″	2.14	1.92	36	A3Vvar	Deneb Alased, Deneb Aleet; δ Sct variable
γ^{1} Leo	γ^{1}	41			89484	50583	10^{h} 19^{m} 58.16^{s}	+19° 50′ 30.7″	2.37	−0.92	126	K0III	Algieba, Al Gieba, Algeiba; has a confirmed planet (b) and an unconfirmed planet (c)
δ Leo	δ	68			97603	54872	11^{h} 14^{m} 06.41^{s}	+20° 31′ 26.5″	2.56	1.32	58	A4V	Zosma, Zozma, Zozca, Zosca, Zubra, Duhr, Dhur
ε Leo	ε	17			84441	47908	09^{h} 45^{m} 51.10^{s}	+23° 46′ 27.4″	2.97	−1.46	251	G0II	Ras Elased, Ras Elased Australis, Algenubi
θ Leo	θ	70			97633	54879	11^{h} 14^{m} 14.44^{s}	+15° 25′ 47.1″	3.33	−0.35	178	A2V	Chertan, Chort, Coxa
ζ Leo	ζ	36			89025	50335	10^{h} 16^{m} 41.40^{s}	+23° 25′ 02.4″	3.43	−1.08	260	F0III	Adhafera, Aldhafera, Aldhafara
η Leo	η	30			87737	49583	10^{h} 07^{m} 19.95^{s}	+16° 45′ 45.6″	3.48	−5.60	2131	A0Ib	Al Jabhah, Al Jabbah, Al'Dzhabkhakh
ο Leo Aa	ο	14			83808	47508	09^{h} 41^{m} 09.12^{s}	+09° 53′ 32.6″	3.52	0.43	135	A5V+...	Subra; 3.52 combined magnitude
ο Leo Ab	ο	14			83808	47508	09^{h} 41^{m} 09.12^{s}	+09° 53′ 32.6″	3.70	0.43	135	A5V+...	Subra; spectroscopic binary
γ^{2} Leo	γ^{2}	41			89485		10^{h} 19^{m} 58.60^{s}	+19° 50′ 26.0″	3.80		130±3		
ρ Leo	ρ	47	14		91316	51624	10^{h} 32^{m} 48.68^{s}	+09° 18′ 23.7″	3.84	−7.38	5719	B1Ib SB	Shaomin; α Cyg variable
μ Leo	μ	24			85503	48455	09^{h} 52^{m} 45.96^{s}	+26° 00′ 25.5″	3.88	0.83	133	K0III	Rasalas, Ras Elased Borealis, Ras al Asad al Shamaliyy, Alshemali, has a planet (b)
ι Leo	ι	78			99028	55642	11^{h} 23^{m} 55.37^{s}	+10° 31′ 46.9″	4.00	2.08	79	F2IV SB	Tsze Tseang, Xīcìjiāng (西次將)
σ Leo	σ	77	46		98664	55434	11^{h} 21^{m} 08.25^{s}	+06° 01′ 45.7″	4.05	−0.04	214	B9.5Vs	Shang Tseang, Xīshǎngjiāng (西上將)
54 Leo		54			94601	53417	10^{h} 55^{m} 36.85^{s}	+24° 44′ 59.1″	4.30	−0.44	289	A1	
υ Leo	υ	91	69		100920	56647	11^{h} 36^{m} 56.93^{s}	−00° 49′ 25.9″	4.30	0.61	178	G9III	
λ Leo	λ	4			82308	46750	09^{h} 31^{m} 43.24^{s}	+22° 58′ 05.0″	4.32	−0.75	336	K5IIIvar	Alterf, Al Terf
31 Leo	A	31			87837	49637	10^{h} 07^{m} 54.32^{s}	+09° 59′ 51.6″	4.39	−0.23	274	K4III	Yunü
60 Leo	b	60			95608	53954	11^{h} 02^{m} 19.78^{s}	+20° 10′ 47.1″	4.42	1.53	124	A1m	
φ Leo	φ	74	43		98058	55084	11^{h} 16^{m} 39.76^{s}	−03° 39′ 05.5″	4.45	0.56	195	A7IVn	
κ Leo	κ	1			81146	46146	09^{h} 24^{m} 39.28^{s}	+26° 10′ 56.8″	4.47	0.39	213	K2III	Al Minliar al Asad
93 Leo		93		DQ	102509	57565	11^{h} 47^{m} 59.23^{s}	+20° 13′ 08.2″	4.50	0.29	226	A comp SB	Tàizǐ (太子); DQ Leo; RS CVn variable
72 Leo		72		FN	97778	54951	11^{h} 15^{m} 12.24^{s}	+23° 05′ 43.9″	4.56	−6.99	6653	M3III	Hǔbēn (虎賁); FN Leo
χ Leo	χ	63	33		96097	54182	11^{h} 05^{m} 01.23^{s}	+07° 20′ 10.0″	4.62	2.31	94	F2III-IVvar	
π Leo	π	29	10		86663	49029	10^{h} 00^{m} 12.82^{s}	+08° 02′ 39.4″	4.68	−1.35	525	M2III	
61 Leo	p^{2}	61	28		95578	53907	11^{h} 01^{m} 49.67^{s}	−02° 29′ 04.2″	4.73	−1.26	514	K5III	
87 Leo	e	87	62		99998	56127	11^{h} 30^{m} 18.88^{s}	−03° 00′ 12.5″	4.77	−1.57	604	K4III	
40 Leo		40			89449	50564	10^{h} 19^{m} 44.31^{s}	+19° 28′ 17.2″	4.78	3.15	69	F6IV	
58 Leo	d	58	26		95345	53807	11^{h} 00^{m} 33.64^{s}	+03° 37′ 03.1″	4.84	−0.26	342	K1III	
τ Leo	τ	84	58		99648	55945	11^{h} 27^{m} 56.23^{s}	+02° 51′ 22.6″	4.95	−1.45	621	G8II-III	
59 Leo	c	59	27		95382	53824	11^{h} 00^{m} 44.83^{s}	+06° 06′ 05.4″	4.98	1.65	151	A5III	
ξ Leo	ξ	5			82395	46771	09^{h} 31^{m} 56.79^{s}	+11° 18′ 00.1″	4.99	0.67	238	K0IIIvar	
10 Leo		10	4		83240	47205	09^{h} 37^{m} 12.71^{s}	+06° 50′ 08.8″	5.00	0.80	226	K1IIIvar	
6 Leo	h	6			82381	46774	09^{h} 31^{m} 57.58^{s}	+09° 42′ 56.9″	5.07	−0.78	482	K3III	
48 Leo		48	15		91612	51775	10^{h} 34^{m} 48.07^{s}	+06° 57′ 13.0″	5.07	0.12	319	G8II-III	
75 Leo		75	44		98118	55137	11^{h} 17^{m} 17.37^{s}	+02° 00′ 39.3″	5.18	−0.31	408	M0III comp	
ν Leo	ν	27			86360	48883	09^{h} 58^{m} 13.39^{s}	+12° 26′ 41.4″	5.26	−0.79	529	B9IV	
92 Leo		92			101484	56975	11^{h} 40^{m} 47.11^{s}	+21° 21′ 10.2″	5.26	1.00	232	K1III	Cóngguān (從官);
22 Leo	g	22			85376	48390	09^{h} 51^{m} 53.02^{s}	+24° 23′ 44.9″	5.29	2.27	131	A5IV	
73 Leo	n	73			97907	55016	11^{h} 15^{m} 51.90^{s}	+13° 18′ 27.3″	5.31	−0.52	478	K3III	
53 Leo	l	53			93702	52911	10^{h} 49^{m} 15.43^{s}	+10° 32′ 42.9″	5.32	0.27	334	A2V	
ψ Leo	ψ	16			84194	47723	09^{h} 43^{m} 43.90^{s}	+14° 01′ 18.1″	5.36	−1.34	713	M2III	
79 Leo		79	51		99055	55650	11^{h} 24^{m} 02.34^{s}	+01° 24′ 27.9″	5.39	0.14	365	G8IIICN...	
ω Leo	ω	2	2		81858	46454	09^{h} 28^{m} 27.38^{s}	+09° 03′ 24.4″	5.40	2.72	112	F9V	
69 Leo	p^{5}	69	37		97585	54849	11^{h} 13^{m} 45.58^{s}	−00° 04′ 10.2″	5.40	−0.42	477	A0V	
37 Leo		37			89056	50333	10^{h} 16^{m} 40.75^{s}	+13° 43′ 42.1″	5.42	−0.51	499	M1III	
46 Leo		46		ES	91232	51585	10^{h} 32^{m} 11.80^{s}	+14° 08′ 14.0″	5.43	−2.18	1083	M2III	ES Leo
HD 94402	p^{1}		21		94402	53273	10^{h} 53^{m} 43.76^{s}	−02° 07′ 45.3″	5.45	0.55	312	G8III	double star
52 Leo	k	52			93291	52689	10^{h} 46^{m} 25.35^{s}	+14° 11′ 41.3″	5.49	0.76	287	G4III:	
51 Leo	m	51			93257	52686	10^{h} 46^{m} 24.49^{s}	+18° 53′ 29.8″	5.50	1.81	178	K3III	
65 Leo	p^{4}	65	34		96436	54336	11^{h} 06^{m} 54.43^{s}	+01° 57′ 20.6″	5.52	1.55	203	G9IIICN...	
95 Leo	o	95			103578	58159	11^{h} 55^{m} 40.53^{s}	+15° 38′ 48.5″	5.53	−0.65	560	A3V	
86 Leo		86			100006	56146	11^{h} 30^{m} 29.08^{s}	+18° 24′ 35.1″	5.54	0.55	325	K0III	
					83069	47168	09^{h} 36^{m} 42.85^{s}	+31° 09′ 42.6″	5.57	−0.25	475	M2III	
81 Leo		81			99285	55765	11^{h} 25^{m} 36.46^{s}	+16° 27′ 23.6″	5.58	2.21	154	F2V	
44 Leo		44	13	DE	90254	51008	10^{h} 25^{m} 15.19^{s}	+08° 47′ 05.8″	5.61	−1.06	704	M2IIIs	DE Leo
15 Leo	f	15			84107	47701	09^{h} 43^{m} 33.27^{s}	+29° 58′ 29.0″	5.64	2.20	159	A2IV	
18 Leo		18			84561	47959	09^{h} 46^{m} 23.34^{s}	+11° 48′ 36.0″	5.67	−0.99	701	K4III	
TX Leonis		49	16	TX	91636	51802	10^{h} 35^{m} 02.19^{s}	+08° 39′ 01.6″	5.67	−0.09	462	A2V	TX Leo; Algol variable
EO Leo					87015	49220	10^{h} 02^{m} 48.96^{s}	+21° 56′ 57.4″	5.68	−2.75	1583	B2.5IV	
67 Leo		67			96738	54487	11^{h} 08^{m} 49.08^{s}	+24° 39′ 30.4″	5.70	0.21	408	A3IV	53 Leonis Minoris
3 Leo		3	3		81873	46457	09^{h} 28^{m} 29.19^{s}	+08° 11′ 18.1″	5.72	−0.29	518	K0III	
8 Leo		8			83189	47189	09^{h} 37^{m} 02.59^{s}	+16° 26′ 16.7″	5.73	−1.60	953	K1III	
85 Leo		85			99902	56080	11^{h} 29^{m} 41.86^{s}	+15° 24′ 48.2″	5.74	0.11	435	K4III	
					86513	48982	09^{h} 59^{m} 36.28^{s}	+29° 38′ 43.2″	5.75	0.76	324	G9III:	
89 Leo		89	65		100563	56445	11^{h} 34^{m} 22.06^{s}	+03° 03′ 37.5″	5.76	3.64	87	F5V	
36 G. Leo			39		97605	54863	11^{h} 14^{m} 01.81^{s}	+08° 03′ 39.4″	5.79	1.61	223	K3III	
5 G. Leo			5		84542	47943	09^{h} 46^{m} 10.04^{s}	+06° 42′ 31.0″	5.80	−1.72	1042	M1III	
					99196	55716	11^{h} 24^{m} 58.99^{s}	+11° 25′ 49.1″	5.80	0.02	468	K4III	
					100808	56601	11^{h} 36^{m} 17.94^{s}	+27° 46′ 52.7″	5.80	1.52	234	F0V	
39 Leo		39			89125	50384	10^{h} 17^{m} 14.80^{s}	+23° 06′ 23.2″	5.81	4.03	74	F8Vw	
					89024	50336	10^{h} 16^{m} 41.84^{s}	+25° 22′ 14.5″	5.84	0.91	315	K2III:	
10 Sex		(10)	8		86080	48734	09^{h} 56^{m} 26.03^{s}	+08° 55′ 59.2″	5.85	−0.73	674	K2III:	
DR Leo				DR	83787	47544	09^{h} 41^{m} 35.11^{s}	+31° 16′ 40.2″	5.90	−1.40	942	K6III	
76 Leo		76	45		98366	55249	11^{h} 18^{m} 54.98^{s}	+01° 39′ 01.9″	5.90	1.00	311	K0III:	
					102590	57606	11^{h} 48^{m} 38.77^{s}	+14° 17′ 03.1″	5.90	1.55	242	F0V	
55 Leo		55	22		94672	53423	10^{h} 55^{m} 42.34^{s}	+00° 44′ 13.0″	5.91	2.70	143	F2III	
56 Leo		56	23	VY	94705	53449	10^{h} 56^{m} 01.48^{s}	+06° 11′ 07.4″	5.91	0.92	325	M5IIIvar	VY Leo
35 Leo		35			89010	50319	10^{h} 16^{m} 32.42^{s}	+23° 30′ 10.8″	5.95	3.54	99	G2IV	
62 Leo	p^{3}	62	31		95849	54049	11^{h} 03^{m} 36.63^{s}	−00° 00′ 03.0″	5.95	−0.21	557	K3III	
90 Leo		90			100600	56473	11^{h} 34^{m} 42.50^{s}	+16° 47′ 48.9″	5.95	−2.98	1988	B4V	
45 Leo		45		CX	90569	51213	10^{h} 27^{m} 38.99^{s}	+09° 45′ 44.7″	6.01	0.65	385	A0sp...	CX Leo; α² CVn variable
R Leo				R	84748		09^{h} 47^{m} 33.50^{s}	+11° 25′ 44.0″	6.02				Mira variable
					88737	50174	10^{h} 14^{m} 29.84^{s}	+21° 10′ 05.6″	6.02	2.44	169	F9V	
					101980	57240	11^{h} 44^{m} 13.17^{s}	+25° 13′ 05.9″	6.02	−1.25	929	K5III	
11 Sex		(11)	9		86369	48876	09^{h} 58^{m} 07.62^{s}	+08° 18′ 50.6″	6.05	−0.04	539	K3III	
					88639	50109	10^{h} 13^{m} 49.72^{s}	+27° 08′ 09.0″	6.05	0.67	389	G5III-IV	
50 G. Leo			50		98960	55595	11^{h} 23^{m} 17.97^{s}	+00° 07′ 55.4″	6.05	−0.53	675	K3	
					102660	57646	11^{h} 49^{m} 14.77^{s}	+16° 14′ 34.8″	6.05	2.07	204	A3m	
43 Leo		43	12		89962	50851	10^{h} 23^{m} 00.46^{s}	+06° 32′ 34.4″	6.06	1.82	229	K3III	
20 Leo		20		DG	85040	48218	09^{h} 49^{m} 50.12^{s}	+21° 10′ 46.0″	6.10	0.11	514	A8IV	DG Leo; α² CVn variable
20 G. Leo			20		94363	53240	10^{h} 53^{m} 25.04^{s}	−02° 15′ 18.0″	6.12	1.61	261	K0III+...	
30 G. Leo			30		95771	54027	11^{h} 03^{m} 14.55^{s}	−00° 45′ 07.4″	6.12	2.43	178	F0V	
					90472	51161	10^{h} 27^{m} 00.52^{s}	+19° 21′ 52.4″	6.15	1.13	329	K0	
42 Leo		42			89774	50755	10^{h} 21^{m} 50.32^{s}	+14° 58′ 32.9″	6.16	0.34	476	A1V	
					94720	53472	10^{h} 56^{m} 16.88^{s}	+22° 21′ 06.0″	6.17	−0.28	637	K2	
59 G. Leo			59		99651	55941	11^{h} 27^{m} 53.73^{s}	−01° 41′ 59.8″	6.23	0.21	522	K2III:	
					82670	46938	09^{h} 33^{m} 59.17^{s}	+23° 27′ 14.8″	6.26	0.29	509	K7III	
13 Leo		13			83821	47550	09^{h} 41^{m} 38.50^{s}	+25° 54′ 46.6″	6.26	0.16	541	K2III:	
					92941	52513	10^{h} 44^{m} 14.62^{s}	+19° 45′ 32.0″	6.27	2.20	212	A5V	
HD 97658					97658	54906	11^{h} 14^{m} 33^{s}	+25° 42′ 37″	6.27		69	K1V	has a planet (b)
88 Leo		88			100180	56242	11^{h} 31^{m} 45.14^{s}	+14° 21′ 53.9″	6.27	4.46	75	G0V	
54 Leo		54			94602		10^{h} 55^{m} 37.30^{s}	+24° 44′ 56.0″	6.30				
					97244	54688	11^{h} 11^{m} 43.79^{s}	+14° 24′ 00.7″	6.30	2.38	198	A5V	
					81361	46232	09^{h} 25^{m} 32.55^{s}	+16° 35′ 08.3″	6.31	1.70	272	G9III:	
19 G. Leo			19		94237	53167	10^{h} 52^{m} 36.10^{s}	−00° 12′ 05.7″	6.31	−0.72	830	K5III	
7 Leo		7			83023	47096	09^{h} 35^{m} 52.91^{s}	+14° 22′ 46.5″	6.32	0.35	510	A1V	
80 Leo		80	55	KV	99329	55791	11^{h} 25^{m} 50.10^{s}	+03° 51′ 36.7″	6.35	2.41	200	F3IV	KV Leo, γ Dor variable
					87500	49445	10^{h} 05^{m} 40.96^{s}	+15° 45′ 27.1″	6.36	1.07	372	F2Vn	
18 G. Leo			18		94180	53141	10^{h} 52^{m} 13.69^{s}	+01° 01′ 29.9″	6.37	−1.16	1045	A3V	
					102910	57779	11^{h} 50^{m} 55.42^{s}	+12° 16′ 44.3″	6.37	2.66	180	A5m	
37 Sex		(37)	17		93244	52660	10^{h} 46^{m} 05.68^{s}	+06° 22′ 23.8″	6.38	1.22	351	K1III:	
					96372	54319	11^{h} 06^{m} 44.01^{s}	+17° 44′ 14.7″	6.40	−0.46	769	K5	
6 LMi		(6)			80956	46058	09^{h} 23^{m} 31.85^{s}	+25° 10′ 58.2″	6.41	−0.18	679	G5III-IV	
					89344	50516	10^{h} 19^{m} 00.74^{s}	+24° 42′ 43.6″	6.42	−1.36	1173	K0	
34 Leo		34			88355	49929	10^{h} 11^{m} 38.19^{s}	+13° 21′ 18.7″	6.43	2.24	225	F7V	
67 G. Leo			67		100659	56500	11^{h} 34^{m} 58.93^{s}	−04° 21′ 40.2″	6.43	0.05	616	K0	
19 Leo		19			84722	48029	09^{h} 47^{m} 25.99^{s}	+11° 34′ 05.4″	6.44	1.67	293	A7Vn	
23 Leo		23			85268	48324	09^{h} 51^{m} 01.97^{s}	+13° 03′ 58.5″	6.45	−2.32	1852	M0III	
HD 100655					100655	56508	11^{h} 35^{m} 03.79^{s}	+20° 26′ 29.6″	6.45	0.71	459	G9III	Formosa, has a planet (b)
HN Leo				HN	86358	48895	09^{h} 58^{m} 26.12^{s}	+27° 45′ 32.6″	6.48	2.36	218	F3V	γ Dor variable
64 Leo		64			96528	54388	11^{h} 07^{m} 39.72^{s}	+23° 19′ 25.5″	6.48	2.09	246	A5m	
					84252	47779	09^{h} 44^{m} 30.00^{s}	+18° 51′ 49.1″	6.49	0.72	464	K0	
					84680	48023	09^{h} 47^{m} 22.20^{s}	+23° 38′ 51.7″	6.49	0.02	643	K0	
83 Leo A		83	57		99491	55846	11^{h} 26^{m} 45.75^{s}	+03° 00′ 45.6″	6.49	5.25	58	K0IV	binary star
			64		100456	56388	11^{h} 33^{m} 36.33^{s}	+02° 29′ 56.7″	6.49	−1.44	1254	K5	
					82523	46891	09^{h} 33^{m} 18.32^{s}	+28° 22′ 04.9″	6.50	1.68	300	A3Vnn	
18 LMi		(18)			86012	48742	09^{h} 56^{m} 31.36^{s}	+32° 23′ 04.6″	6.55	3.02	165	F2	
50 Leo		50			92196	52120	10^{h} 38^{m} 54.53^{s}	+16° 07′ 38.7″	6.60	3.02	168	F5V	
9 Leo		9			83273	47247	09^{h} 37^{m} 49.96^{s}	+24° 40′ 13.1″	6.61	2.41	225	G0III	
11 Leo		11			83343	47266	09^{h} 38^{m} 01.31^{s}	+14° 20′ 50.8″	6.63	2.58	210	F2	
57 Leo		57			94738	53460	10^{h} 56^{m} 10.53^{s}	+00° 25′ 58.6″	6.65	−0.15	746	K0	
82 Leo		82			99305	55769	11^{h} 25^{m} 39.45^{s}	+03° 18′ 04.1″	6.73	2.07	317	A5IV	
21 Leo		21			85259	48298	09^{h} 50^{m} 49.27^{s}	+11° 50′ 32.7″	6.85	0.02	548	A0	
52 LMi		(52)			96418	54347	11^{h} 07^{m} 04.91^{s}	+25° 32′ 13.8″	6.86	3.14	181	F8IV	
71 Leo		71			98824	55533	11^{h} 22^{m} 29.02^{s}	+17° 26′ 13.4″	7.03	0.16	773	K1III	
HD 89307					89307	50473	10^{h} 18^{m} 21.28^{s}	+12° 37′ 16.0″	7.06	4.61	101	G0V	has a planet (b)
38 Sex		(38)			93431	53460	10^{h} 47^{m} 19.16^{s}	+06° 20′ 46.4″	7.13	2.23	311	A2	
12 Leo		12			83469	47382	09^{h} 39^{m} 12.82^{s}	+25° 22′ 02.6″	7.21	2.10	313	F0	
49 LMi		(49)			94671	53439	10^{h} 55^{m} 56.09^{s}	+18° 09′ 10.8″	7.25	0.82	631	G5	
26 Leo		26			86359	48881	09^{h} 58^{m} 11.70^{s}	+15° 13′ 16.8″	7.45	2.73	322	G5	
83 Leo B		83			99492	55848	11^{h} 26^{m} 46.28^{s}	+03° 00′ 22.8″	7.57	6.29	59	K2V	component of the 83 Leo system; has two planets (b and c)
HD 94834					94834	53545	10^{h} 57^{m} 15.1^{s}	+24° 08′ 34″	7.6		264	K1	has a planet (b)
HD 81040					81040	46076	09^{h} 23^{m} 47.09^{s}	+20° 21′ 52.0″	7.74	5.18	106	G2/G3	has a planet (b)
33 Leo		33			88233	49850	10^{h} 10^{m} 42.92^{s}	+15° 42′ 15.9″	7.95	2.97	399	F0	
HD 87646					87646	53666	10^{h} 58^{m} 47.74^{s}	+01° 43′ 45.2″	7.95	2.08	486	G2V	has a planet (b)
HD 95089					95089	49522	10^{h} 06^{m} 40.8^{s}	+17° 53′ 42″	8.0			G1IV	has a planet (b & c)
HD 83225					83225	47211	09^{h} 37^{m} 17.3^{s}	+15° 15′ 09.2″	8.04	2.92	345	F2	Scheiner's Star
HD 88133					88133	49813	10^{h} 10^{m} 07.68^{s}	+18° 11′ 12.7″	8.06	3.70	243	G5IV	has a planet (b)
HD 96063					96063	54158	11^{h} 04^{m} 44 ^{s}	−02° 30′ 48″	8.37		515	K0	Dingolay, has a planet (b)
HD 100777					100777	56572	11^{h} 35^{m} 51.53^{s}	−04° 45′ 20.5″	8.42	4.81	172	K0V	Sagarmatha, has a planet (b)
HD 98736					98736	55486	11^{h} 21^{m} 49.0^{s}	+18° 11′ 24″	8.52		101	G5	has a planet (b)
HD 102272					102272	57428	11^{h} 46^{m} 23.54^{s}	+14° 07′ 26.3″	8.71	0.93	1200	K0III	has two planets (b & c)
HD 99109					99109	55664	11^{h} 24^{m} 17.0^{s}	−01° 31′ 44″	9.1		197	K4V	Shama, has a planet (b)
AD Leo				AD			10^{h} 19^{m} 36.277^{s}	+19° 52′ 12.06″	9.32		16.1	M3.5Ve	Flare star
HD 89345					89345	50496	10^{h} 18^{m} 41.0^{s}	+10° 07′ 45″	9.4		413	G5V	has two planets (b)
BD+20°2457							10^{h} 16^{m} 44.86^{s}	+19° 53′ 29.0″	9.73		650	K2II	has a planet (c) and a brown dwarf (b)
Gl 436						57087	11^{h} 42^{m} 11.09^{s}	+26° 42′ 23.7″	10.68	10.63	33	M2.5	nearby, has a transiting planet (b)
ο Leo B	ο	14			83809		09^{h} 41^{m} 13.40^{s}	+09° 54′ 35.0″	11.0				optical component of the ο Leo system
WASP-104							10^{h} 42^{m} 24.6^{s}	+07° 26′ 06″	11.12		466	G8	has a transiting planet (b)
WASP-106							11^{h} 05^{m} 43.1^{s}	−05° 04′ 46″	11.21		923	F9	has a transiting planet (b)
WASP-183							10^{h} 55^{m} 09.0^{s}	−00° 44′ 14″	12.76		1070	G9/K0	has a transiting planet (b)
Wolf 359				CN			10^{h} 56^{m} 28.99^{s}	+07° 00′ 52.0″	13.45	16.64	7.78	M6 V	CN Leo; 3rd nearest star system; Proxima Leonis; flare star
CW Leo				CW			09^{h} 47^{m} 57.38^{s}	+13° 16′ 43.6″	14.5		200	C9,5e	AGB star, carbon star, variable; brightest star at N-band (10 μm wavelength)
Caffau's Star							10^{h} 29^{m} 15.15^{s}	+17° 29′ 28″	16.92		4469		Caffau's Star
DP Leonis				DP			11^{h} 17^{m} 16.00^{s}	+17° 57′ 41.1″	17.5	9.49	1304	DA/M5V?	has a planet (b)
2MASS 0937+2931							09^{h} 37^{m} 34.9^{s}	+29° 31′ 41″			20.0	T6	
2MASS J1047+21							10^{h} 47^{m} 53.85^{s}	+21° 24′ 23.47″			34	T6.5	
Table legend: • Name = Proper name • B = Bayer designation • F or/and G. = Flamsteed designation or Gould designation • Var = Variable-star designation • HD = Henry Draper Catalogue designation number • HIP = Hipparcos Catalogue designation number • RA = Right ascension for the Epoch/Equinox J2000.0 • Dec = Declination for the Epoch/Equinox J2000.0 • vis. mag. = visual magnitude (m or m_{v}), also known as apparent magnitude • abs. mag. = absolute magnitude (M_{v}) • Dist. (ly) = Distance in light-years from Earth • Sp. class = Spectral class of the star in the stellar classification system • Notes = Common name(s) or alternate name(s); comments; notable properties [for example: multiple star status, range of variability if it is a variable star, exoplanets, etc.]

== See also ==
- List of stars by constellation
