= P Leonis =

The Bayer designation p Leonis (p Leo) is shared by five star systems in the constellation Leo:

- p^{1} Leonis (HD 94402)
- p^{2} Leonis (61 Leonis)
- p^{3} Leonis (62 Leonis)
- p^{4} Leonis (65 Leonis)
- p^{5} Leonis (69 Leonis)

Not to be confused with:

- π Leonis
- ρ Leonis
