= TX Ursae Majoris =

Eclipsing binary star system in the constellation of Ursa Major

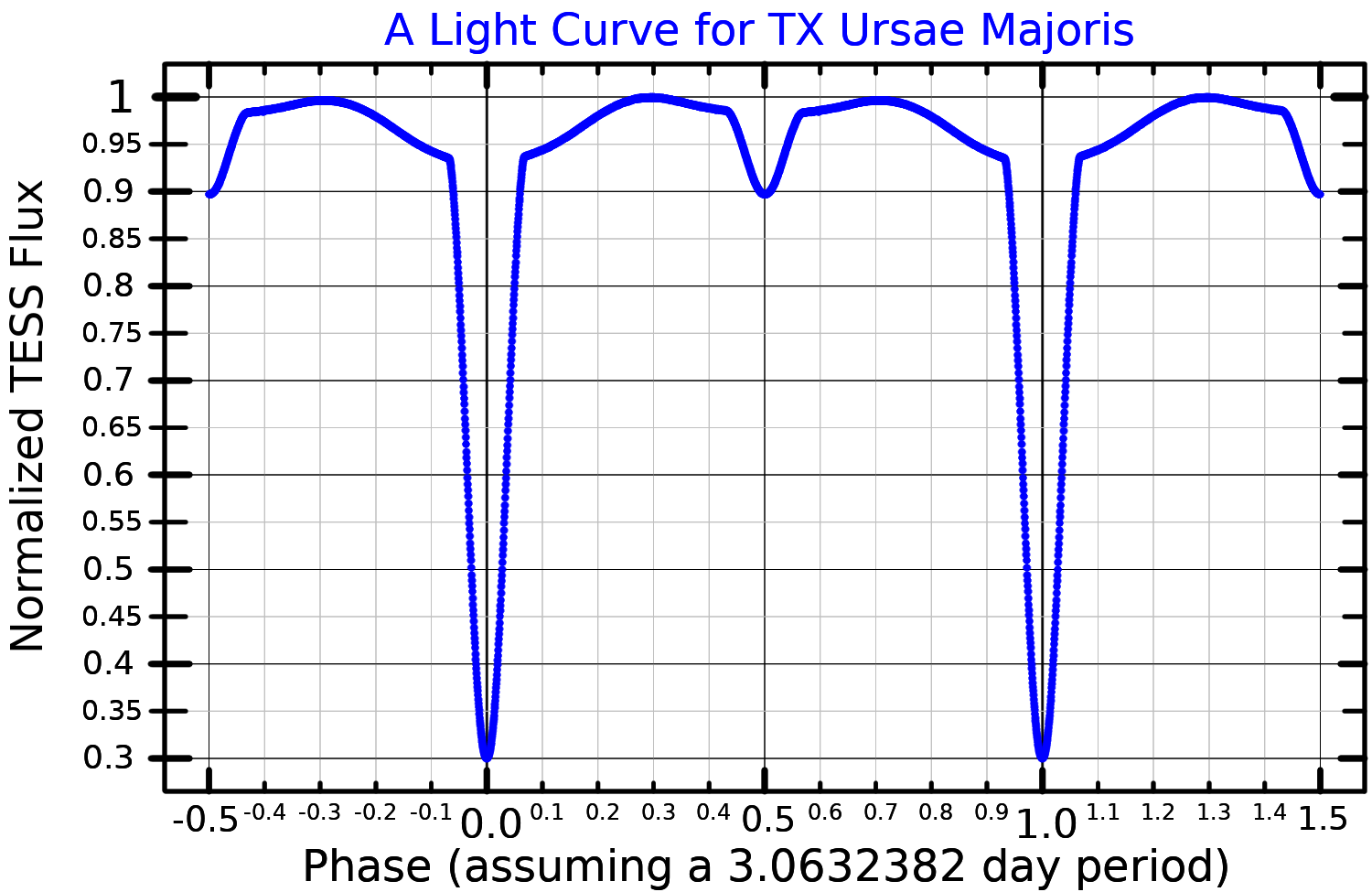
- A light curve for TX Ursae Majoris, plotted from TESS data

Observation data Epoch J2000.0 Equinox ICRS
- Constellation: Ursa Major
- Right ascension: 10^{h} 45^{m} 20.504^{s}
- Declination: +45° 33′ 58.71″
- Apparent magnitude (V): 6.97

Characteristics
- Spectral type: B8V + G0III-IV
- B−V color index: −0.003±0.026
- Variable type: β Per

Astrometry
Radial velocity (R_{v})	−13.2±0.9 km/s
Proper motion (μ)	RA: 9.595 mas/yr Dec.: 4.412 mas/yr
Parallax (π)	4.1849±0.0841 mas
Distance	780 ± 20 ly (239 ± 5 pc)
Absolute magnitude (M_{V})	0.60

Orbit (1990)
Period (P)	3.063 d
Semi-major axis (a)	≥ 3.315 R_{☉}
Eccentricity (e)	0.0134
Argument of periastron (ω) (secondary)	324.7°
Semi-amplitude (K_{1}) (primary)	54.8 km/s

Details

TX UMa A
Mass	4.76±0.16 M_{☉}
Radius	2.83 R_{☉}
Luminosity	182+18 −16 L_{☉}
Surface gravity (log g)	4.2±0.15 cgs
Temperature	12,900±300 K
Rotational velocity (v sin i)	69±3 km/s

TX UMa B
Mass	1.18±0.06 M_{☉}
Radius	4.24 R_{☉}
Luminosity	13.5+6.0 −4.2 L_{☉}
Surface gravity (log g)	3.3±0.3 cgs
Temperature	5,500±500 K
Rotational velocity (v sin i)	72±5 km/s

Other designations
- TX Uma, BD+46 1659, GC 14783, HD 93033, HIP 52599, SAO 43460, PPM 52052

Database references
SIMBAD	data

TX Ursae Majoris is an eclipsing binary star system in the northern circumpolar constellation of Ursa Major. With a combined apparent visual magnitude of 6.97, the system is too faint to be readily viewed with the naked eye. The pair orbit each other with a period of 3.063 days in a circular orbit, with their orbital plane aligned close to the line of sight from the Earth. During the primary eclipse, the net brightness decreases by 1.74 magnitudes, while the secondary eclipse results in a drop of just 0.07 magnitude. TX UMa is located at a distance of approximately 780 light years from the Sun based on parallax measurements, but is drifting closer with a mean radial velocity of −13 km/s.

In 1931, H. Rügemer and H. Schneller independently discovered this is an eclipsing binary system of the Algol type. Rügemer later found that the eclipse period was not constant, a behavior that was subsequently explained as apsidal precession. B. Cester and associates in 1977 confirmed this is a semidetached binary system consisting of a main sequence primary star and an evolved giant companion. A study of the system by J. M. Kreiner and J. Tremko in 1980 disproved that changes in the eclipse period are due to apsidal motion.

The light curve of this system shows little impact from proximity effects between the two stars, making it only weakly interacting. The primary eclipse is very deep with less than 5% of the brighter star's light appearing at central eclipse, allowing the spectrum of the fainter secondary to be directly examined. In addition to a steady decrease in the system orbital period, multiple irregular changes in the period were observed between 1903 and 1996. The slowing orbit may be due in part from magnetic breaking of the mass-donor secondary, causing a transfer of angular momentum to the system. An accretion disk may be a contributing factor. Spectral evidence supports an accretion disk in orbit around the primary that is sustained by mass transfer. A faint emission from the system is evidence of a circumbinary ionized shell.

The cooler secondary component is the more evolved member of the pair with a stellar classification of G0III-I, having previously exhausted the supply of hydrogen at its core and evolved off the main sequence. This star has filled its Roche lobe and is contributing mass to the primary. It now has 1.2 times the Sun's mass but has expanded to 4.2 times the solar radius. The secondary is rotating synchronously with its orbit. The primary component of this system is a B-type main-sequence star with a stellar classification of B8V. It is rotating 1.5 times as fast as the orbital rate due to the impact of mass accretion from the secondary. The primary has 4.8 times the mass and 2.8 times the radius of the Sun.
