= HD 139319 =

Triple star system in constellation Draco

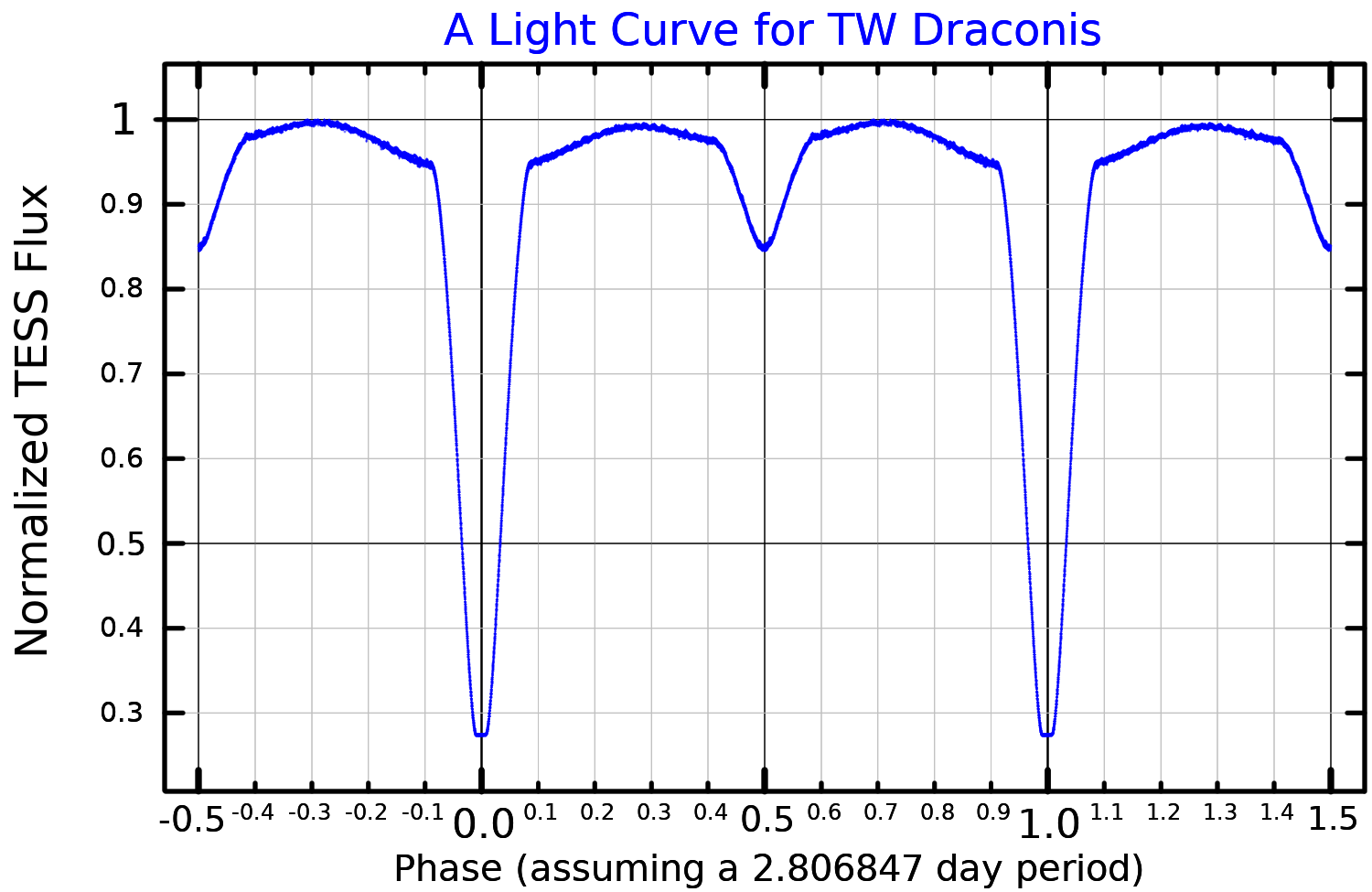
- A light curve for TW Draconis, plotted from TESS data

Observation data Epoch J2000 Equinox ICRS
- Constellation: Draco
- Right ascension: 15^{h} 33^{m} 51.0571^{s}
- Declination: +63° 54′ 25.695″
- Apparent magnitude (V): 7.46

Characteristics

HD 139319A
- Spectral type: A8V+K0III
- Apparent magnitude (g): 7.39

HD 139319B
- Spectral type: F7V
- Apparent magnitude (g): 9.65

Astrometry

HD 139319A
Proper motion (μ)	RA: 11.44±0.03 mas/yr Dec.: 22.39±0.02 mas/yr
Parallax (π)	6.0571±0.0179 mas
Distance	538 ± 2 ly (165.1 ± 0.5 pc)

HD 139319B
Radial velocity (R_{v})	1.6±0.7 km/s
Proper motion (μ)	RA: 12.09±0.02 mas/yr Dec.: 21.278±0.018 mas/yr
Parallax (π)	6.0345±0.0160 mas
Distance	540 ± 1 ly (165.7 ± 0.4 pc)

Orbit
Primary	TW Draconis A
Name	TW Draconis B
Period (P)	2.8068491 d
Semi-major axis (a)	0.057 AU
Inclination (i)	86.8°
Semi-amplitude (K_{1}) (primary)	64.05 km/s
Semi-amplitude (K_{2}) (secondary)	150 km/s

Details

TW Draconis A
Mass	2.16±0.11 M_{☉}
Radius	2.64±0.04 R_{☉}
Surface gravity (log g)	3.928±0.026 cgs
Temperature	7815±92 K

TW Draconis B
Mass	0.93±0.05 M_{☉}
Radius	3.66±0.06 R_{☉}
Surface gravity (log g)	3.314±0.026 cgs
Temperature	4442±32 K

Other designations
- BD+64 1077, HIP 76196, 2MASS J15335104+6354257, GSC 04184-00061
- HD 139319A: TW Draconis, TYC 4184-61-1, Gaia DR2 1640708022815757568
- HD 139319B: TYC 4184-61-2, Gaia DR2 1640708022815757824

Database references
SIMBAD	data

HD 139319 is a ternary system composed of the binary Algol variable star known as TW Draconis, and a main-sequence companion star at a separation of 3 arcseconds. The system lies in the constellation of Draco about 540 light years away.

== System ==
The primary star is an eclipsing, semi-detached binary, the brighter component of which is a pulsating star of Delta Scuti type. Its pulsation frequency is 17.99 cycles per day. Mass transfer between stars is ongoing in the system with a transfer rate of 6.8×10^{−7}M_{☉}/year. The 2.8 day period of the Algol binary is cyclically variable with a period 116.04 years, possibly due to gravitational influence of the distant companion HD 139319B. Another three stars in the system are suspected.
