= TW Andromedae =

Star in the constellation Andromeda

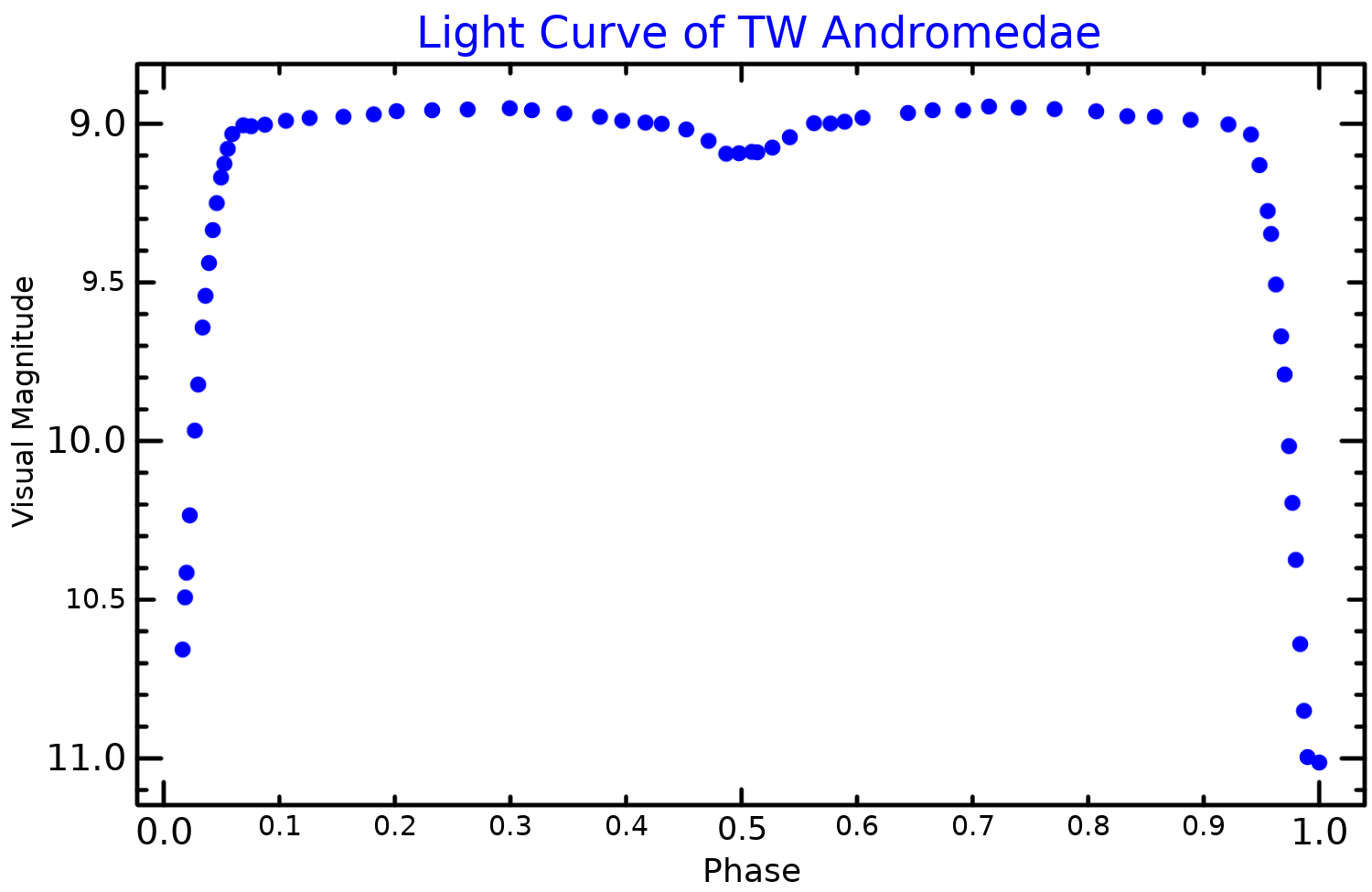
- The visual band light curve of TW Andromedae, plotted from data published by Ammann & Walter

Observation data Epoch J2000 Equinox ICRS
- Constellation: Andromeda
- Right ascension: 00^{h} 03^{m} 18.22730^{s}
- Declination: +32° 50′ 45.1053″
- Apparent magnitude (V): 8.98 – 11.050 variable

Characteristics
- Evolutionary stage: main sequence
- Spectral type: F0V + K0
- B−V color index: 0.11
- Variable type: EA

Astrometry
Radial velocity (R_{v})	−51.27±0.42 km/s
Proper motion (μ)	RA: +52.514±0.024 mas/yr Dec.: −2.981±0.017 mas/yr
Parallax (π)	3.8518±0.0282 mas
Distance	847 ± 6 ly (260 ± 2 pc)

Orbit
Period (P)	4.12 days
Semi-major axis (a)	13.6 R_{☉}
Eccentricity (e)	0.0
Inclination (i)	86.9°
Periastron epoch (T)	JD 2440700±300
Semi-amplitude (K_{1}) (primary)	27±1.5 km/s
Semi-amplitude (K_{2}) (secondary)	140±2.0 km/s

Details

TW And A
Mass	1.685 M_{☉}
Radius	2.05 R_{☉}
Luminosity	4.3 L_{☉}
Temperature	7250±25 K

TW And B
Mass	0.325 M_{☉}
Radius	3.20 R_{☉}
Luminosity	14.5 L_{☉}
Temperature	4658 K

Other designations
- BD+32 4756, HIP 262, SAO 53603, TYC 2263-975-1, 2MASS J00031822+3250451

Database references
SIMBAD	data

TW Andromedae (TW And) is an eclipsing binary star, classified also as an Algol variable star, in the constellation Andromeda. Its brightness varies with a period of 4.12 days, and has a typical brightness of magnitude 8.98 but decreasing down to a magnitude of 11.04 during the main eclipse.

TW Andromedae was discovered to be an Algol variable by August Kopff in 1909.

The TW Andromedae system is made of two stars in a circular orbit around their center of mass, with an orbital plane almost parallel to our line of sight. The presence of a third body in the system, with a minimum mass of 0.27 M_{☉} and an orbital period of 49.6 years, has been proposed to account for the observed changes in the period of the variability.

Like in all Algol variable stars, when both stars of the system are aligned with respect to our line of sight, the furthest component blocks the light of the other, thus the apparent luminosity of the system diminishes. When the brightest component eclipses the other, a secondary, less pronounced minimum in the luminosity occurs.
