= IO Aquarii =

Hierarchical triple star system

Observation data Epoch J2000 Equinox ICRS
- Constellation: Aquarius
- Right ascension: 20^{h} 40^{m} 45.469^{s}
- Declination: +00° 56′ 21.01″
- Apparent magnitude (V): 8.80 to 9.22

Characteristics

Inner pair
- Evolutionary stage: Main sequence + main sequence
- Spectral type: F5V (F5 V-IV + F6 V-IV)
- Variable type: Algol

Outer
- Evolutionary stage: main sequence
- Spectral type: K6V

Astrometry
Radial velocity (R_{v})	+124.90 km/s
Parallax (π)	3.9926±0.0215 mas
Distance	817 ± 4 ly (250 ± 1 pc)

Details

primary
Mass	1.569 M_{☉}
Radius	2.19 R_{☉}
Luminosity	7.59 L_{☉}
Surface gravity (log g)	3.95 cgs
Temperature	6,475 K
Age	1.88 Gyr

secondary
Mass	1.655 M_{☉}
Radius	2.49 R_{☉}
Luminosity	9.00 L_{☉}
Surface gravity (log g)	3.86 cgs
Temperature	6,331 K
Age	1.88 Gyr

Details

Outer
Mass	0.6 M_{☉}
Temperature	~4,000 K

Other designations
- BD+00 4569, HD 196991, HIP 102041, SAO 126097, TYC 511-960-1, 2MASS J20404547+0056209

Database references
SIMBAD	data

IO Aquarii (IO Aqr) is a hierarchical triple star system located in the constellation of Aquarius. The inner component is a detached double-lined eclipsing binary with a short orbital period, around which a low-mass, low-luminosity companion star moves on a wide, highly eccentric outer orbit. Despite its relative brightness (apparent magnitude 8.8 except when in eclipse), the system's variability was not recognised until photometric observations by the Hipparcos satellite mission, after which the variable star designation IO Aqr was assigned by Kazarovets et al. (1999).

The inner pair is a double-lined spectroscopic binary on a circular orbit with a period 2.368 days. A third body orbits the inner binary on a much wider, highly eccentric orbit with a period estimated at ≳25,000 days (≳70 years). The existence of the outer companion was established from two independent lines of evidence: periodic variations in eclipse timing (the light-travel time effect) and a faint additional peak in the broadening function of the spectra.
