= 59 Leonis =

Star in the constellation Leo

Observation data Epoch J2000 Equinox J2000
- Constellation: Leo
- Right ascension: 11^{h} 00^{m} 44.80142^{s}
- Declination: +06° 06′ 05.2093″
- Apparent magnitude (V): 4.98

Characteristics
- Spectral type: A5 III or A6 IV
- B−V color index: 0.166±0.005

Astrometry
Radial velocity (R_{v})	−11.7±1.3 km/s
Proper motion (μ)	RA: −52.73 mas/yr Dec.: −23.23 mas/yr
Parallax (π)	21.57±0.26 mas
Distance	151 ± 2 ly (46.4 ± 0.6 pc)
Absolute magnitude (M_{V})	1.65

Details
Mass	1.73 M_{☉}
Luminosity	18.27 L_{☉}
Surface gravity (log g)	4.15±0.14 cgs
Temperature	8,277±281 K
Rotational velocity (v sin i)	82 km/s
Age	332 Myr

Other designations
- c Leo, 59 Leo, BD+06°2384, HD 95382, HIP 53824, HR 4294, SAO 118615, WDS J11007+0606A

Database references
SIMBAD	data

59 Leonis, or c Leonis, is a single white-hued star in the southern part of the constellation of Leo. It is north of 58 Leonis, south of Chi Leonis, and well east of the bright star Regulus. Its apparent visual magnitude is 4.98, so it is dimly visible to the naked eye, 0.21 degree south of the ecliptic. The annual parallax shift as seen from Earth's orbit is 21.57±0.26 mas, giving a distance estimate of about 151 light years. The star is moving closer to the Sun with a heliocentric radial velocity of −12 km/s.

Cowley et al. (1969) assigned 59 Leonis a stellar classification of A5 III, matching the spectrum of an A-type giant star, but Gray and Garrison (1989) found a class of A6 IV, suggesting it is a subgiant star. Hauck (1986) noted that the star is classified as a giant, but the colors match a dwarf star and it had been previously classified as F3 V. It is an estimated 332 million years old with a high rate of spin, showing a projected rotational velocity of 82 km/s. The star has around 1.73 times the mass of the Sun and is radiating 18 times the Sun's luminosity from its photosphere at an effective temperature of about 8,277 K.
