= HD 88133 =

Star in the constellation Leo

Observation data Epoch J2000.0 Equinox ICRS
- Constellation: Leo
- Right ascension: 10^{h} 10^{m} 07.676^{s}
- Declination: +18° 11′ 12.73″
- Apparent magnitude (V): 8.01

Characteristics
- Evolutionary stage: subgiant
- Spectral type: G8V
- B−V color index: 0.810±0.015

Astrometry
Radial velocity (R_{v})	−3.62±0.14 km/s
Proper motion (μ)	RA: −11.135 mas/yr Dec.: −264.912 mas/yr
Parallax (π)	13.5882±0.0249 mas
Distance	240.0 ± 0.4 ly (73.6 ± 0.1 pc)
Absolute magnitude (M_{V})	3.50

Details
Mass	1.23±0.16 M_{☉}
Radius	2.01±0.04 R_{☉}
Luminosity	3.14±0.02 L_{☉}
Surface gravity (log g)	3.82 cgs
Temperature	5,414±97 K
Metallicity [Fe/H]	0.26 dex
Rotational velocity (v sin i)	4.9 km/s
Age	5.08 Gyr

Other designations
- BD+18 2326, HD 88133, HIP 49813, SAO 98978, LTT 12725, NLTT 23562, TYC 1422-1130-1, 2MASS J10100767+1811132

Database references
SIMBAD	data

HD 88133 is a yellow star with an orbiting exoplanet in the equatorial constellation of Leo. It has an apparent visual magnitude of 8.01, which is too faint to be visible to the naked eye. With a small telescope it should be easily visible. The distance to this system, as measured through parallax, is 240 light years, but it is slowly drifting closer with a radial velocity of −3.6 km/s.

This is classified as an ordinary G-type main-sequence star with a stellar classification of G8V. However, D. A. Fischer and associates in 2005 listed a class of G5 IV, suggesting it is instead a subgiant star that is evolving away from the main sequence having exhausted the hydrogen at its core. It is about 5 billion years old and is spinning with a projected rotational velocity of 4.9 km/s. The star has 23% more mass than the Sun and has double the Sun's girth. It is radiating over three times the luminosity of the Sun from its photosphere at an effective temperature of 5,414 K.

== Planetary system ==
In 2004 a close orbiting exoplanet was found using Doppler spectroscopy. In 2016 the direct detection of the planetary thermal emission spectrum was claimed, but the detection was brought into questioned in 2021.

The HD 88133 planetary system
Companion (in order from star)	Mass	Semimajor axis (AU)	Orbital period (days)	Eccentricity	Inclination (°)	Radius
b	≥0.282±0.046 M_{J}	0.0479±0.0032	3.414887±0.000045	0 (fixed)	—	—

== See also ==
- List of extrasolar planets
- List of stars in Leo
