= HD 89307 =

Star in the constellation Leo

Observation data Epoch J2000.0 Equinox ICRS
- Constellation: Leo
- Right ascension: 10^{h} 18^{m} 21.28771^{s}
- Declination: +12° 37′ 15.9909″
- Apparent magnitude (V): 7.02

Characteristics
- Evolutionary stage: main sequence
- Spectral type: G0V
- B−V color index: 0.594±0.003

Astrometry
Radial velocity (R_{v})	+23.27±0.13 km/s
Proper motion (μ)	RA: −272.659 mas/yr Dec.: −39.333 mas/yr
Parallax (π)	31.4134±0.0226 mas
Distance	103.83 ± 0.07 ly (31.83 ± 0.02 pc)
Absolute magnitude (M_{V})	4.57

Details
Mass	1.028±0.04 M_{☉}
Radius	1.08+0.01 −0.02 R_{☉}
Luminosity	1.354±0.003 L_{☉}
Surface gravity (log g)	4.414±0.10 cgs
Temperature	5,950±44 K
Metallicity [Fe/H]	−0.15±0.02 dex
Rotation	23.7 d
Rotational velocity (v sin i)	3.21±0.50 km/s
Age	5.3+2.7 −2.9 Gyr; 6.76 Gyr

Other designations
- BD+13 2237, GC 14140, HD 1835, HIP 50473, SAO 99049, PPM 127289

Database references
SIMBAD	data

HD 89307 is a star in the equatorial constellation of Leo. It is too faint to be viewed with the naked eye except under ideal conditions, having an apparent visual magnitude of 7.02. The star is located at a distance of 104 light-years (32 parsecs) from the Sun based on parallax, and is drifting further away with a radial velocity of +23 km/s.

This is an ordinary G-type main-sequence star with a stellar classification of G0V. It is chromospherically inactive and appears older than the Sun with a rotation period of 23.7 days. The star has about the same mass as the Sun and is 8% larger. It is radiating 1.35 times the Sun's luminosity from its photosphere at an effective temperature of 5,950 K.

== Planetary system ==
In December 2004, using the radial velocity method, it was found to have a long-period giant planet in orbit around it. The parameters of HD 89307 b were updated in 2012, and in 2023 its inclination and true mass were determined via astrometry.

The HD 89307 planetary system
Companion (in order from star)	Mass	Semimajor axis (AU)	Orbital period (years)	Eccentricity	Inclination (°)	Radius
b	2.02+0.27 −0.15 M_{J}	3.331+0.052 −0.053	5.991+0.081 −0.078	0.174+0.041 −0.043	72+13 −15 or 108+15 −13	—

== See also ==
- List of extrasolar planets
- List of stars in Leo
