= HD 102272 =

Star in the constellation Leo

Observation data Epoch J2000 Equinox J2000 (ICRS)
- Constellation: Leo
- Right ascension: 11^{h} 46^{m} 23.535^{s}
- Declination: +14° 07′ 26.35″
- Apparent magnitude (V): 8.69

Characteristics
- Evolutionary stage: red giant branch
- Spectral type: K0 III
- U−B color index: 0.69
- B−V color index: 1.02

Astrometry
Radial velocity (R_{v})	−11.99±0.03 km/s
Proper motion (μ)	RA: −7.371 mas/yr Dec.: 7.639 mas/yr
Parallax (π)	2.8571±0.1135 mas
Distance	1,140 ± 50 ly (350 ± 10 pc)
Absolute magnitude (M_{V})	0.74

Details
Mass	1.01±0.122 M_{☉}
Radius	8.02±2.14 R_{☉}
Luminosity	25 L_{☉}
Surface gravity (log g)	2.57±0.04 cgs
Temperature	4,750±10 K
Metallicity [Fe/H]	−0.49±0.06 dex
Rotational velocity (v sin i)	2.10±0.90 km/s
Age	8.13 Gyr

Other designations
- BD+14 2434, HD 102272, HIP 57428, SAO 99784

Database references
SIMBAD	data

HD 102272 is a star in the equatorial constellation of Leo. With an apparent visual magnitude of 8.69, it is too faint to be visible to the naked eye. The star is located at a distance of approximately 1,140 light years based on parallax measurements, but is drifting closer to the Sun with a radial velocity of −12 km/s. As of 2008, two extrasolar planets are known to orbit the star.

This is an evolved giant star with a stellar classification of K0. It is an estimated eight billion years old and has expanded to eight times the Sun's radius. The star has about the same mass as the Sun and is spinning with a projected rotational velocity of 2 km/s. It is radiating 25 times the luminosity of the Sun from its swollen photosphere at an effective temperature of 4,750 K.

== Planetary system ==
In June 2008, the discovery of two extrasolar planets orbiting the star was announced. The planets were detected using the radial velocity method with the Hobby-Eberly Telescope. The radial velocity data clearly shows the presence of the inner planet (HD 102272 b). Although there is evidence for another planet, there is insufficient data to unambiguously determine its orbit. The pair are close to a 4:1 orbital resonance with the outer planet in a high eccentricity orbit.

The HD 102272 planetary system
Companion (in order from star)	Mass	Semimajor axis (AU)	Orbital period (days)	Eccentricity	Inclination (°)	Radius
b	>5.9±0.2 M_{J}	0.614±0.001	127.58±0.30	0.05±0.04	—	—
c	>2.6±0.4 M_{J}	1.57±0.05	520±26	0.68±0.06	—	—

== See also ==
- List of stars in Leo
