= 39 Leonis =

Star in the constellation Leo

Observation data Epoch J2000 Equinox ICRS
- Constellation: Leo
- A
- Right ascension: 10^{h} 17^{m} 14.538^{s}
- Declination: +23° 06′ 22.38″
- Apparent magnitude (V): 5.81
- B
- Right ascension: 10^{h} 17^{m} 14.046^{s}
- Declination: +23° 06′ 26.19″
- Apparent magnitude (V): 11.40

Characteristics
- Spectral type: F6 V + M1
- U−B color index: −0.05
- B−V color index: +0.50

Astrometry

A
Radial velocity (R_{v})	+37.4 km/s
Proper motion (μ)	RA: −413.372 mas/yr Dec.: −98.047 mas/yr
Parallax (π)	44.9008±0.0699 mas
Distance	72.6 ± 0.1 ly (22.27 ± 0.03 pc)
Absolute magnitude (M_{V})	+4.0

B
Radial velocity (R_{v})	+38.07±0.27 km/s
Proper motion (μ)	RA: −417.816 mas/yr Dec.: −95.966 mas/yr
Parallax (π)	44.8768±0.0276 mas
Distance	72.68 ± 0.04 ly (22.28 ± 0.01 pc)
Absolute magnitude (M_{V})	+9.6

Details

39 Leo A
Mass	1.17 M_{☉}
Radius	1.25 R_{☉}
Luminosity	2.19 L_{☉}
Surface gravity (log g)	4.29±0.14 cgs
Temperature	6,118±49 K
Metallicity [Fe/H]	–0.27 dex
Rotational velocity (v sin i)	2.16 km/s
Age	6.3 Gyr

39 Leo B
Mass	0.46 M_{☉}
Radius	0.47 R_{☉}
Luminosity	0.037 L_{☉}
Surface gravity (log g)	4.83±0.05 cgs
Temperature	3,740±40 K
Metallicity [Fe/H]	−0.33±0.06 dex

Other designations
- 39 Leo, BD+23 2207, GJ 387, HD 89125, HIP 50384, HR 4039, SAO 81270

Database references
SIMBAD	data
- B

39 Leonis is the Flamsteed designation for a star in the zodiac constellation of Leo. It has an apparent visual magnitude of 5.90, so, according to the Bortle scale, it is faintly visible from suburban skies at night. Parallax measurements show an annual parallax shift of 0.0449″, which is equivalent to a distance of around 72.6 ly (22.3 pc) from the Sun.

The stellar classification of 39 Leonis is F6 V, indicating it is a main-sequence star. It shines with a luminosity more than double that of the Sun, although it has nearly the same mass and size. This is a mature star with an estimated age of 6.3 billion years. The abundance of elements other than hydrogen and helium is about half that in the Sun, making this a metal-poor star. The effective temperature of the stellar atmosphere is 6,118 K, giving it the yellow-white-hued glow of an F-type star.

Observations made with the Akari satellite at a wavelength of 18 μm show an excess of infrared emission. This suggests the presence of an inner debris disk orbiting the star at a distance greater than four astronomical units (AU). There was no significant excess found at 22 μm.

A companion star is located at an angular separation of 7.72″ along a position angle of 302.7°—this corresponds to a projected separation of 175 AU. It is a red dwarf star with a classification of M1 and an apparent visual magnitude of 11.40.

== See also ==
- List of stars in Leo
