= 93 Leonis =

Star in the constellation Leo

- Location of 93 Leonis (circled in red)

Observation data Epoch J2000 Equinox ICRS
- Constellation: Leo
- Right ascension: 11^{h} 47^{m} 59.13595^{s}
- Declination: +20° 13′ 08.1500″
- Apparent magnitude (V): 4.522

Characteristics
- Spectral type: G5III + A7V
- U−B color index: +0.28
- B−V color index: +0.9 / +0.2
- Variable type: RS CVn

Astrometry
Radial velocity (R_{v})	0.750 ± 0.05 km/s
Proper motion (μ)	RA: −145.49 mas/yr Dec.: −4.34 mas/yr
Parallax (π)	14.02±0.23 mas
Distance	233 ± 4 ly (71 ± 1 pc)
Absolute magnitude (M_{V})	+0.23

Orbit
Period (P)	71.69 d
Semi-major axis (a)	7.5±0.1 mas
Eccentricity (e)	0
Inclination (i)	50.1±0.5°
Longitude of the node (Ω)	138±1°
Periastron epoch (T)	JD 2447642.6 ± 0.2
Argument of periastron (ω) (secondary)	0°
Semi-amplitude (K_{1}) (primary)	29.67±0.29 km/s
Semi-amplitude (K_{2}) (secondary)	33.8±2.1 km/s

Details

93 Leo Aa
Mass	2.25±0.29 M_{☉}
Radius	9.1±0.5 R_{☉}
Luminosity	49.4±3.4 L_{☉}
Temperature	5,100±100 K

93 Leo Ab
Mass	1.97±0.15 M_{☉}
Radius	2.7±0.2 R_{☉}
Luminosity	23.9±1.9 L_{☉}
Temperature	7,800±200 K

Other designations
- DQ Leo, BD+21°2358, FK5 1304, HD 102509, HIP 57565, HR 4527, SAO 81998

Database references
SIMBAD	data

93 Leonis (93 Leo) is a binary star in the constellation Leo. Its apparent magnitude is 4.522. Based on the system's parallax, 93 Leonis is located about 233 light-years (71 parsecs) away.

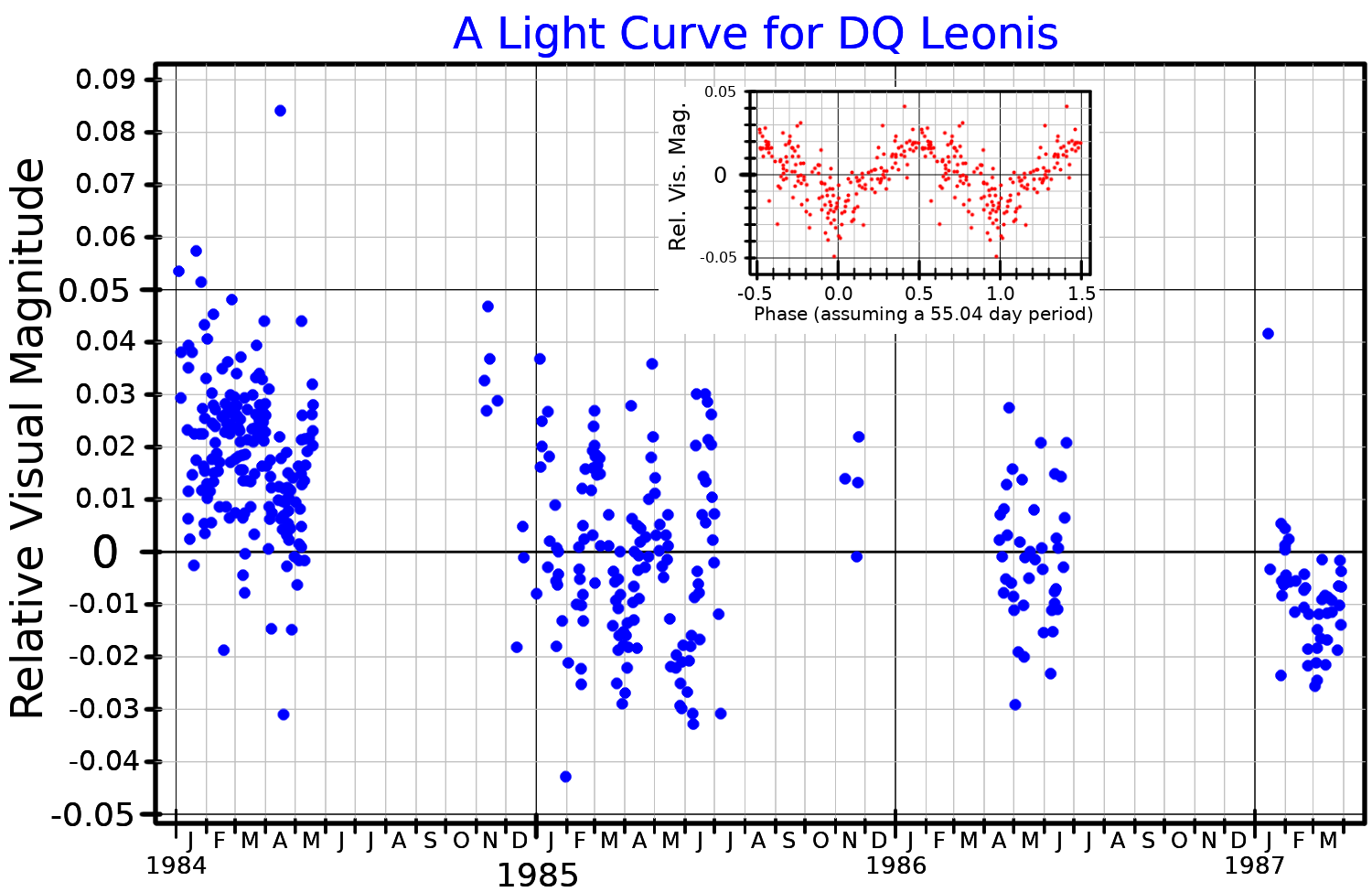
A visual band light curve for DQ Leonis. The main plot shows the brightness variation over several years, and the inset plot shows the periodic variation seen during 1985. Adapted from Strassmeier et al. (1989)

93 Leonis is a double-lined spectroscopic binary. Two components are known to exist, because their spectral lines shift periodically, due to the Doppler effect. The two stars are a G-type red giant and an A-type main-sequence star. They complete an orbit once every 71.69 days. The system is also known to be an RS Canum Venaticorum variable, due to its binarity. For that reason, it has been given the variable star designation DQ Leonis.

In Chinese astronomy, 93 Leonis is called 太子, Pinyin: Tàizǐ, meaning Crown Prince, because this star is marking itself and stand alone in Crown Prince asterism, Supreme Palace enclosure mansion (see : Chinese constellation).

== See also ==
- List of stars in Leo
