= 83 Leonis =

Binary star system in the constellation Leo

Observation data Epoch J2000.0 Equinox ICRS
- Constellation: Leo
- 83 Leonis A
- Right ascension: 11^{h} 26^{m} 45.32173^{s}
- Declination: +03° 00′ 47.1566″
- Apparent magnitude (V): 6.45
- 83 Leonis B
- Right ascension: 11^{h} 26^{m} 46.27833^{s}
- Declination: +03° 00′ 22.7567″
- Apparent magnitude (V): 7.58

Characteristics

A
- Evolutionary stage: main sequence
- Spectral type: G9IV-V
- U−B color index: +0.62
- B−V color index: +0.85

B
- Evolutionary stage: main sequence
- Spectral type: K2V
- U−B color index: +1.024
- B−V color index: +0.913

Astrometry

83 Leonis A
Radial velocity (R_{v})	4.18±0.13 km/s
Proper motion (μ)	RA: −725.963(29) mas/yr Dec.: 180.980(30) mas/yr
Parallax (π)	55.0090±0.0240 mas
Distance	59.29 ± 0.03 ly (18.179 ± 0.008 pc)
Absolute magnitude (M_{V})	+5.24

83 Leonis B
Radial velocity (R_{v})	3.63±0.13 km/s
Proper motion (μ)	RA: −728.131(34) mas/yr Dec.: 188.554(27) mas/yr
Parallax (π)	55.0618±0.0304 mas
Distance	59.23 ± 0.03 ly (18.16 ± 0.01 pc)
Absolute magnitude (M_{V})	+6.26

Details

83 Leonis A
Mass	0.95±0.06 M_{☉}
Radius	0.96+0.04 −0.02 R_{☉}
Luminosity	0.74 L_{☉}
Surface gravity (log g)	4.42 cgs
Temperature	5,509±8.6 K
Metallicity	0.30
Rotational velocity (v sin i)	5.1 km/s
Age	8.09±6.75 Gyr

83 Leonis B
Mass	0.85±0.02 M_{☉}
Radius	0.78±0.02 R_{☉}
Luminosity (bolometric)	0.418±0.057 L_{☉}
Surface gravity (log g)	4.57±0.06 cgs
Temperature	4929±44 K
Metallicity	0.3±0.03
Rotation	40-45 days
Rotational velocity (v sin i)	0.41±0.5 km/s
Age	4.8±4.1 Gyr

Other designations
- GJ 429, HR 4414, WDS J11268+0301
- A: BD+03°2502, HD 99491, HIP 55846, Wolf 393
- B: BD+03°2503, HD 99492, HIP 55848, Wolf 394

Database references
SIMBAD	data
- HD 99491
- HD 99492

83 Leonis, abbreviated 83 Leo, is a binary star system approximately 59 light-years away in the constellation of Leo (the Lion). The primary star of the system is a cool orange subgiant star, while the secondary star is an orange dwarf star. The two stars are separated by at least 515 astronomical units from each other, and have a combined apparent magnitude of 6.12. Both stars are presumed to be cooler than the Sun.

The primary star is also known as HD 99491 and the secondary star as HD 99492. In 2005, an exoplanet was confirmed to be orbiting the secondary star within the system.

== Stellar system ==
The primary component, 83 Leonis A, is a 6th magnitude star. It is not visible to the unaided eye, but easily visible with small binoculars. The star is classified as a subgiant, meaning that it has ceased fusing hydrogen in its core and started to evolve towards red gianthood.

The secondary component, 83 Leonis B, is an 8th magnitude orange dwarf, somewhat less massive (0.88 M_{Sun}), smaller and cooler than the Sun. It is visible only with binoculars or better equipment. Components A and B share common proper motion, which confirms them as a physical pair. The projected separation between the stars is 515 AU, but the true separation may be much higher.

There is yet another, magnitude 14.4 component listed in the Washington Double Star Catalog. However, this star is moving into a different direction and is therefore not a true member of the 83 Leonis system.

== Planetary system ==
Planet 83 Leonis Bb was discovered in Jan 2005 by the California and Carnegie Planet Search team, who use the radial velocity method to detect planets. The planet's minimum mass is less than half of the mass of Saturn. It orbits very close to the star, completing one orbit in about 17 days.

In 2010, a second planet, 83 Leonis Bc, was claimed, but was found to be a false positive in 2016. However, in 2023 a different second planet was discovered, also given the designation "c".

The 83 Leonis B planetary system
Companion (in order from star)	Mass	Semimajor axis (AU)	Orbital period (days)	Eccentricity	Inclination (°)	Radius
b	≥25.5±0.6 M_{🜨}	0.123±0.001	17.0503±0.0016	0.034+0.025 −0.021	—	—
c	≥17.9±1.3 M_{🜨}	—	95.233+0.098 −0.096	0.063+0.060 −0.040	—	—

== See also ==
- 16 Cygni
- 30 Arietis
- List of stars in Leo
