= HD 33564 =

Star in the constellation Camelopardalis

- Location of HD 33564 (circled in red)

Observation data Epoch J2000 Equinox ICRS
- Constellation: Camelopardalis
- Right ascension: 05^{h} 22^{m} 33.5306^{s}
- Declination: +79° 13′ 52.143″
- Apparent magnitude (V): 5.08

Characteristics
- Evolutionary stage: main sequence
- Spectral type: F7V
- U−B color index: −0.13
- B−V color index: 0.506±0.002

Astrometry
Radial velocity (R_{v})	−11.09(13) km/s
Proper motion (μ)	RA: −78.661(67) mas/yr Dec.: 162.098(77) mas/yr
Parallax (π)	48.1098±0.0727 mas
Distance	67.8 ± 0.1 ly (20.79 ± 0.03 pc)
Absolute magnitude (M_{V})	3.59

Details
Mass	1.29 M_{☉}
Radius	1.51+0.02 −0.06 R_{☉}
Luminosity	3.428±0.017 L_{☉}
Surface gravity (log g)	4.22 cgs
Temperature	6,396+135 −36 K
Metallicity [Fe/H]	0.14 dex
Rotational velocity (v sin i)	14.3 km/s
Age	1.80 Gyr

Other designations
- BD+79°169, GC 6455, GJ 196, HD 33564, HIP 25110, HR 1686, SAO 5496

Database references
SIMBAD	data
Exoplanet Archive	data

HD 33564 is a single star with an exoplanetary companion in the northern constellation of Camelopardalis. It has an apparent visual magnitude of 5.08, which means it is a 5th magnitude star that is faintly visible to the naked eye. The system is located at a distance of 68 light years from the Sun based on parallax, and it is drifting closer with a radial velocity of −11 km/s. It is a candidate member of the Ursa Major Moving Group.

== Description ==
This is an ordinary F-type main-sequence star with a stellar classification of F7V, indicating that the star is hotter and more massive than the Sun, giving it a yellow-white hue. The star is about two billion years old and is chromospherically quiet, with a projected rotational velocity of 14.3 km/s. It has about 1.5 times the radius and 1.3 times the mass of the Sun. The star is radiating 3.4 times the luminosity of the Sun from its photosphere at an effective temperature of 6,396 K.

== Possible planetary system ==
In September 2005, a massive planet was found on an eccentric orbit about the star, based on a small sample of radial velocity variations measured by the ELODIE spectrograph. An infrared excess had been detected at a wavelength of 60 μm, suggesting the star may host a circumstellar disk. However, the existence of a disk is unlikely because the infrared radiation is coming from a background galaxy.

The planet has not been confirmed by any subsequent study. Based on the limited data used to detect it and lack of follow-up observations, a 2025 study considered it a dubious planet detection.

The HD 33564 planetary system
Companion (in order from star)	Mass	Semimajor axis (AU)	Orbital period (days)	Eccentricity	Inclination (°)	Radius
b (disputed)	>9.1 M_{J}	1.1	388 ± 3	0.34 ± 0.02	—	—

== See also ==
- List of extrasolar planets
