= HD 81040 =

Star in the constellation Leo

Observation data Epoch J2000 Equinox ICRS
- Constellation: Leo
- Right ascension: 09^{h} 23^{m} 47.08737^{s}
- Declination: +20° 21′ 52.0349″
- Apparent magnitude (V): +7.73

Characteristics
- Evolutionary stage: main sequence
- Spectral type: G0V
- B−V color index: 0.680±0.012

Astrometry
Radial velocity (R_{v})	+49.270±0.0017 km/s
Proper motion (μ)	RA: −151.265±0.045 mas/yr Dec.: 35.708±0.036 mas/yr
Parallax (π)	29.0635±0.0414 mas
Distance	112.2 ± 0.2 ly (34.41 ± 0.05 pc)
Absolute magnitude (M_{V})	5.12

Details
Mass	0.962±0.040 M_{☉}
Radius	0.91+0.01 −0.03 R_{☉}
Luminosity	0.838±0.018 L_{☉}
Surface gravity (log g)	4.48 cgs
Temperature	5,753 K
Metallicity [Fe/H]	−0.06±0.03 dex
Rotation	15.98 d
Rotational velocity (v sin i)	5.3 km/s
Age	1.79+0.30 −0.26 Gyr

Other designations
- BD+20°2374, FK5 4836, GC 12951, HD 81040, HIP 46076, SAO 80800, PPM 99541

Database references
SIMBAD	data

HD 81040 is a star in the equatorial constellation of Leo. With an apparent visual magnitude of +7.73 it is too dim to be visible to the naked eye but can be viewed with a small telescope. The star is located at a distance of 112 light years from the Sun based on parallax. It is drifting further away with a radial velocity of +49 km/s, having come to within 48 light-years some 527,000 years ago.

== Properties ==
This is an ordinary G-type main-sequence star with a stellar classification of G0V. The Sun somewhat dwarfs HD 81040 in terms of physical characteristics: it has 87% of the Sun's mass and 91% of the radius of the Sun. It is spinning with a projected rotational velocity of 5.3 km/s, and has near solar metallicity. The age of the star is not precisely known; the ELODIE spectrograph suggested 0.8 Gyr and found it to have a young dust disk. Later measurements by modelling chromosperic activity suggested an age of 4.18 Gyr.

== Planetary system ==
On November 24, 2005, a superjovian planet was announced by Sozzetti et al. It was discovered using the radial velocity method. Astrometric measurements using Gaia, published in several papers, show that the inclination of its orbit is about 111 degrees, so its true mass is somewhat higher than that predicted from its minimum mass.

The HD 81040 planetary system
Companion (in order from star)	Mass	Semimajor axis (AU)	Orbital period (days)	Eccentricity	Inclination (°)	Radius
b	7.53±0.032 M_{J}	1.946±0.014	1,004.7±3.0	0.525+0.024 −0.026	111.4+4.4 −4.7	—

== See also ==
- List of extrasolar planets
- List of stars in Leo
