= 729 Watsonia =

Rare-type main-belt asteroid

Discovery
- Discovered by: Joel Hastings Metcalf
- Discovery site: Winchester, Massachusetts
- Discovery date: 9 February 1912

Designations
- Pronunciation: /wɒtˈsoʊniə/
- Alternative designations: 1912 OD

Orbital characteristics
- Epoch 31 July 2016 (JD 2457600.5)
- Uncertainty parameter 0
- Observation arc: 98.79 yr (36082 d)
- Aphelion: 3.0270 AU (452.83 Gm)
- Perihelion: 2.4917 AU (372.75 Gm)
- Semi-major axis: 2.7594 AU (412.80 Gm)
- Eccentricity: 0.096988
- Orbital period (sidereal): 4.58 yr (1674.2 d)
- Mean anomaly: 223.02°
- Mean motion: 0° 12^{m} 54.108^{s} / day
- Inclination: 18.042°
- Longitude of ascending node: 124.388°
- Argument of perihelion: 88.376°

Physical characteristics
- Mean radius: 24.575±0.75 km
- Synodic rotation period: 25.230 h (1.0513 d)
- Geometric albedo: 0.1381±0.009
- Absolute magnitude (H): 9.31

729 Watsonia is a rare-type asteroid and namesake of the Watsonia family from the central region of the asteroid belt. It was named after the Canadian-American astronomer James C. Watson. Watsonia occulted the star 54 Leonis (HIP 53417, a 4.3 Magnitude Star) on 2013 Mar 03 at 01:48.

== Description ==
This object is the namesake of the Watsonia family, an Asteroid family of approximately 100 asteroids that share similar spectral properties and orbital elements; hence they may have arisen from the same collisional event. All members have a relatively high orbital inclination.
