= HD 97658 =

Star in the constellation Leo

Observation data Epoch J2000.0 Equinox ICRS
- Constellation: Leo
- Right ascension: 11^{h} 14^{m} 33.1613^{s}
- Declination: +25° 42′ 37.392″
- Apparent magnitude (V): 7.762±0.012

Characteristics
- Evolutionary stage: Main sequence
- Spectral type: K1V
- B−V color index: 0.843±0.022
- Variable type: Planetary transit variable

Astrometry
Radial velocity (R_{v})	−1.579±0.0011 km/s
Proper motion (μ)	RA: −107.534±0.091 mas/yr Dec.: 48.662±0.090 mas/yr
Parallax (π)	46.412±0.022 mas
Distance	70.27 ± 0.03 ly (21.55 ± 0.01 pc)
Absolute magnitude (M_{V})	6.14

Details
Mass	0.773^{+0.015}_{−0.018} M_{☉}
Radius	0.728±0.008 R_{☉}
Luminosity (bolometric)	0.351±0.007 L_{☉}
Surface gravity (log g)	4.52 ± 0.06 cgs
Temperature	5212±43 K
Metallicity [Fe/H]	−0.30±0.03 dex
Rotation	38.5±1.0
Rotational velocity (v sin i)	0.92±0.05 km/s
Age	3.9^{+2.6}_{−2.03} Gyr

Other designations
- BD+26°2184, GJ 3651, HD 97658, HIP 54906, SAO 81730, GSC 01981-01168, 2MASS J11143316+2542374

Database references
SIMBAD	data

HD 97658 is a star with an exoplanetary companion in the equatorial constellation of Leo. The star is too dim to be seen with the naked eye, having an apparent visual magnitude of 7.76. It is located at a distance of 70 light years based on parallax, but is slowly drifting closer with a radial velocity of −1.6 km/s.

This is an ordinary K-type main-sequence star with a stellar classification of K1V. The star has 77% of the mass and 73% of the radius of the Sun. Estimates of the star's age ranges from four to six billion years. It is spinning with a rotation period of around 39 days and shows a magnetic activity cycle of 9.6 years, which is slightly shorter than the solar cycle. The chromospheric activity is lower than average for stars of this class.

HD 97658 is radiating 35% of the luminosity of the Sun from its photosphere at an effective temperature of 5,212 K. The star has a low metallicity – the atmospheric abundance of elements with a higher atomic number than helium, which explains why it lies 0.46 magnitudes below average for main sequence stars of its type.

== Planetary system ==
On November 1, 2010, a super-Earth was announced orbiting the star along with Gliese 785 b as part of the NASA-UC Eta-Earth program. The planet orbits in just under 9.5 days and was originally thought to have a minimum mass of 8.2 ± 1.2 M_{🜨}. Spurred by the possibility of transits, additional data was acquired for less than a year which found a lower mass for the star and hence reduced the minimum mass of the planet to 6.4 ± 0.7 M_{🜨}, and improved certainty on the time of possible transit. Transits of the planet were apparently detected and announced on September 12, 2011; this would make HD 97658 the second-to-brightest star with a transiting planet after 55 Cancri and indicating a low-density planet like Gliese 1214 b. However, the occurrence of transits was quietly retracted on April 11, 2012, and three days later it was announced that observations by the MOST space telescope could not confirm transits. Transits of radii larger than 1.87 R_{🜨} were ruled out.

Further transit measurements were taken in April 2012 and were confirmed with transit readings made in the following year, March and April 2013. It was determined that HD 97658 b had a diameter 2.34 times that of Earth. Using a radial velocity mass of 7.86 M_{🜨} and the radius measured from the transits taken in 2012 and 2013 and in early 2014, the density of the planet was calculated as 3.44 g cm^{−3}. It is likely therefore that the super-Earth exoplanet HD 97658 b has a large rocky core covered with a thick layer of volatiles, either a deep ocean of water or a thick atmosphere possibly made up of a mixture of helium and hydrogen. The gravity on this exoplanet's surface is about 1.6 times greater than that of Earth's. The planetary transmission spectrum of HD 97658 b taken in 2020 have revealed presence of clouds up to millibar pressure. Although no conclusion can be made on atmosphere composition, best model fitting is obtained with hydrogen-helium envelope with carbon monoxide and methane admixture. No helium was detected at HD 97658 b in 2020 though.

The HD 97658 planetary system
Companion (in order from star)	Mass	Semimajor axis (AU)	Orbital period (days)	Eccentricity	Inclination (°)	Radius
b	7.81 ^{+0.55}_{−0.44} M_{🜨}	0.0796 ± 0.0012	9.49073 ±0.00015	0.03 ^{+0.034}_{−0.021}	89.6 ±0.1	2.247 ^{+0.098}_{−0.095} R_{🜨}

== See also ==
- List of stars in Leo
