= HD 100655 =

Star in the constellation Leo

HD 100655 / Formosa
- Location of HD 100655 (circled in red)

Observation data Epoch J2000.0 Equinox ICRS
- Constellation: Leo
- Right ascension: 11^{h} 35^{m} 03.75320^{s}
- Declination: +20° 26′ 29.5630″
- Apparent magnitude (V): +6.45

Characteristics
- Evolutionary stage: red clump
- Spectral type: G9 III
- B−V color index: 1.010±0.015

Astrometry
Radial velocity (R_{v})	−5.16±0.13 km/s
Proper motion (μ)	RA: –59.897 mas/yr Dec.: –0.996 mas/yr
Parallax (π)	7.2345±0.0294 mas
Distance	451 ± 2 ly (138.2 ± 0.6 pc)
Absolute magnitude (M_{V})	1.02

Details
Mass	2.2±0.1 M_{☉}
Radius	8.8±0.1 R_{☉}
Luminosity	40.8±0.3 L_{☉}
Surface gravity (log g)	2.89±0.02 cgs
Temperature	4,918±8 K
Metallicity [Fe/H]	0.07±0.03 dex
Rotational velocity (v sin i)	1.6±1.0 km/s
Age	900±200 Myr

Other designations
- Formosa, BD+21°2331, HD 100655, HIP 56508, HR 4459, SAO 81886, 2MASS J11350375+2026295

Database references
SIMBAD	data
Exoplanet Archive	data

HD 100655, also named Formosa, is a star in the zodiac constellation of Leo, located 451 light-years away from the Sun. It has an apparent visual magnitude of +6.45, which makes it a challenge to see with the naked eye under ideal viewing conditions. The star is moving closer to the Earth with a heliocentric radial velocity of −5 km/s. It has one confirmed planet.

HD 100655 is an evolved giant star with a stellar classification of G9 III. It is a red clump giant, which means it is currently on the horizontal branch and is generating energy through helium fusion at its core. This star is around 900 million years old with 2.2 times the mass of the Sun and has expanded to 8.8 times the Sun's radius. It is radiating 4,918 times the Sun's luminosity from its enlarged photosphere at an effective temperature of 4,918 K.

== Naming ==
The star HD 100655 is named Formosa. The name was selected in the NameExoWorlds campaign by Taiwan, during the 100th anniversary of the IAU. Formosa is the historical name of Taiwan used in the 17th century, meaning 'beautiful' in Portuguese. The planet HD 100655 b is named Sazum, after the township Yuchi and it means 'water' in the Thao language.

== Planetary system ==
The planetary companion, announced in 2011, was discovered by a Korean–Japanese planet search program by the radial velocity method. The motions of the host star displayed Keplerian variation, indicating a perturbing body in orbit. The best fit model suggests a body having a minimum mass of 1.7 M_{J} and showing a 158-day orbital period with a semimajor axis of 0.76 astronomical units (114 Gm) and a low eccentricity of 0.085. This is one of the two least massive planets known around clump giants, as of 2012.

The HD 100655 planetary system
Companion (in order from star)	Mass	Semimajor axis (AU)	Orbital period (days)	Eccentricity	Inclination (°)	Radius
b / Sazum	>1.7 M_{J}	0.76^{+0.02}_{−0.04}	157.57 ± 0.65	0.085 ± 0.054	—	—

== See also ==
- List of stars in Leo
