= HD 33564 b =

Extrasolar planet in the constellation Camelopardalis

Discovery
- Discovered by: Galland et al.
- Discovery site: (France) Haute-Provence Observatory
- Discovery date: September 3, 2005
- Detection method: Doppler Spectroscopy

Orbital characteristics
- Semi-major axis: 1.117 ± 0.027 AU (167,100,000 ± 4,000,000 km)
- Eccentricity: 0.34 ± 0.02
- Orbital period (sidereal): 388 ± 3 d
- Argument of periastron: 205 ± 4
- Semi-amplitude: 232 ± 5
- Star: HD 33564

HD 33564 b is an extrasolar planet located approximately 68 light-years away in the constellation of Camelopardalis. This planet orbits around F6V star HD 33564. The planet has an eccentric orbit, ranging in distance from 0.737 AU at periastron to 1.497 AU at apastron.

HD 33564 b is a gas giant in a habitable zone of its star. Based on a probable 10^{−4} fraction of the planet mass as a satellite, it can have a Mars-sized moon with habitable surface. On the other hand, this mass can be distributed into many small satellites as well.

== See also ==
- HD 81040 b
