= HD 89307 b =

Exoplanet orbiting the star HD 89307 in the constellation of Leo

Discovery
- Discovered by: Butler et al. Fischer et al.
- Discovery site: United States
- Discovery date: December 26, 2004
- Detection method: radial velocity

Orbital characteristics
- Semi-major axis: 3.331+0.052 −0.053 AU
- Eccentricity: 0.174+0.041 −0.043
- Orbital period (sidereal): 2188+30 −28 d 5.991+0.081 −0.078 yr
- Average orbital speed: 16.6
- Inclination: 72°+13° −15° or 108°+15° −13°
- Longitude of ascending node: 151+20 −133
- Time of periastron: 2456758±96
- Argument of periastron: 22+320 −14
- Semi-amplitude: 31.0 ± 4.9
- Star: HD 89307

Physical characteristics
- Mass: 2.02+0.27 −0.15 M_{J}

HD 89307 b is an exoplanet orbiting the star HD 89307 located approximately 104 light-years away in the constellation of Leo. The planet takes roughly 2164 days or 5.9 years to orbit its star. The planet's minimum mass is 1.92 M_{J}; initially, the true mass could not be determined since the inclination was unknown. As is common for many long-period exoplanets, the eccentricity is greater than any planets in the Solar System, orbiting at an average distance of 3.28 AU. The speed of the wobble caused by the planet's gravity is 31 meters per second. The average orbital velocity is 16.6 m/s. In 2023, the inclination and true mass of HD 89307 b were determined via astrometry.
