= VV Orionis =

Star in the constellation Orion

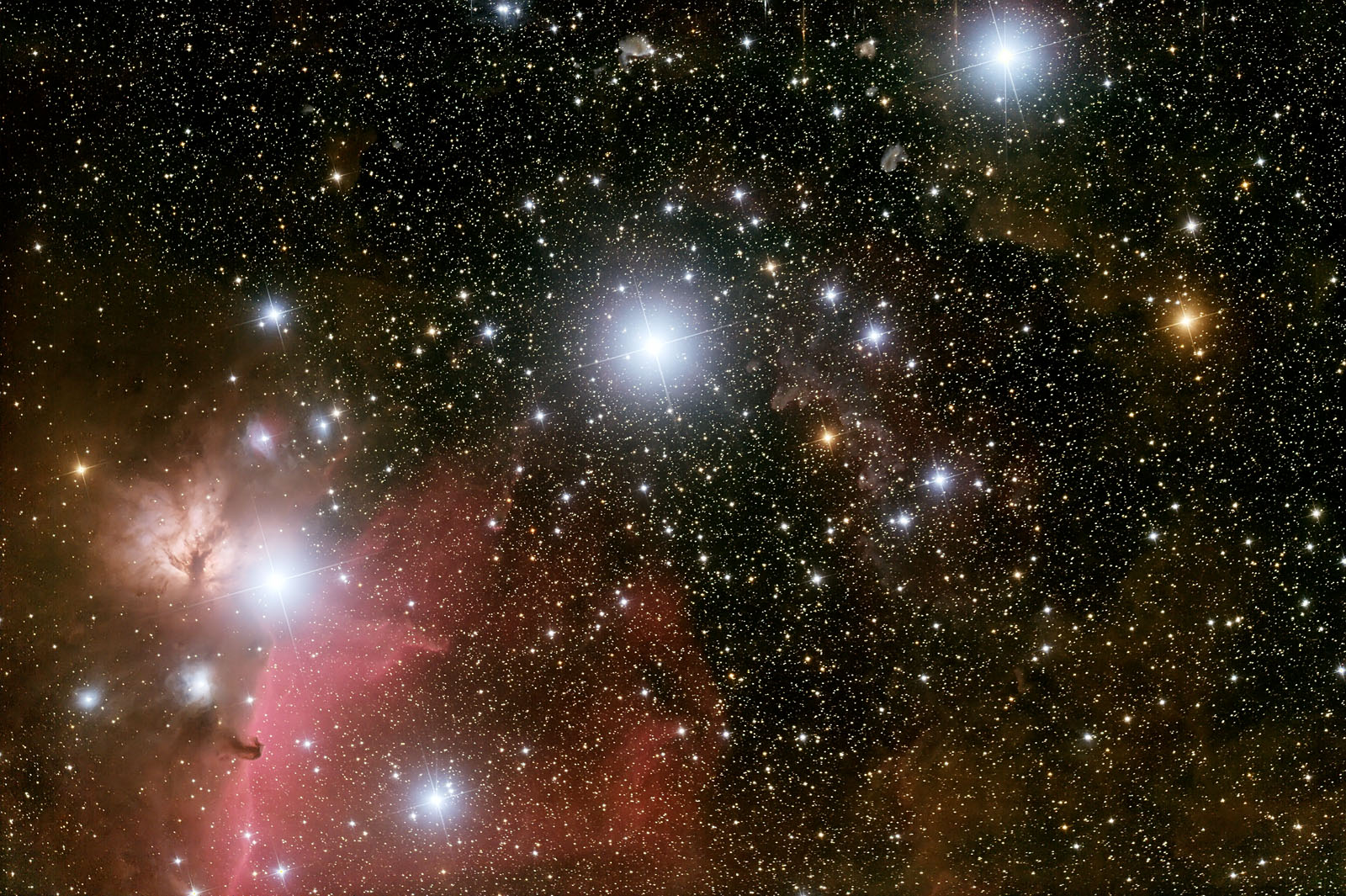
- Location of VV Orionis (circled) in the Orion's Belt region Credit: Martin Mutti

Observation data Epoch J2000 Equinox ICRS
- Constellation: Orion
- Right ascension: 05^{h} 33^{m} 31.44649^{s}
- Declination: −01° 09′ 21.8595″
- Apparent magnitude (V): 5.31 (- 5.55) - 5.66

Characteristics
- Evolutionary stage: B1V + B7V
- U−B color index: −0.09
- B−V color index: −0.18
- Variable type: Eclipsing, β Cephei

Astrometry
Radial velocity (R_{v})	22.2 km/s
Proper motion (μ)	RA: −1.088 mas/yr Dec.: −1.183 mas/yr
Parallax (π)	2.2654±0.1138 mas
Distance	1,210 ± 39 ly (371 ± 12 pc)
Absolute bolometric magnitude (M_{bol})	−5.44 + −1.75

Orbit
Period (P)	1.4853784 days
Semi-major axis (a)	13.91 R_{☉}
Eccentricity (e)	0
Inclination (i)	78.28°
Semi-amplitude (K_{1}) (primary)	137.20 km/s
Semi-amplitude (K_{2}) (secondary)	328.58 km/s

Details

VV Ori A
Mass	11.56 M_{☉}
Radius	5.11 R_{☉}
Luminosity	11,700 L_{☉}
Surface gravity (log g)	4.08 cgs
Temperature	26,660 K

VV Ori B
Mass	4.81 M_{☉}
Radius	2.51 R_{☉}
Luminosity	398 L_{☉}
Surface gravity (log g)	4.32 cgs
Temperature	16,250 K

Other designations
- HR 1868, HD 36695, HIP 26063, BD−01°943, SAO 132255, TYC 4766-2449-1

Database references
SIMBAD	data

VV Orionis is an eclipsing binary located in the belt region of the constellation Orion. It is a faint naked eye star.

The brightness of VV Orionis dips regularly every 18 hours. The peak visual magnitude is 5.3, which varies slowly in between the dips. The minimum brightness of the dips alternates between magnitude 5.55 and 5.66. The deep minima have a somewhat rounded bottom, while the less deep minima have flat bottoms with a constant magnitude for several hours. However, there are also additional cycles in the lightcurve that suggest that at least one of the stars is pulsating.

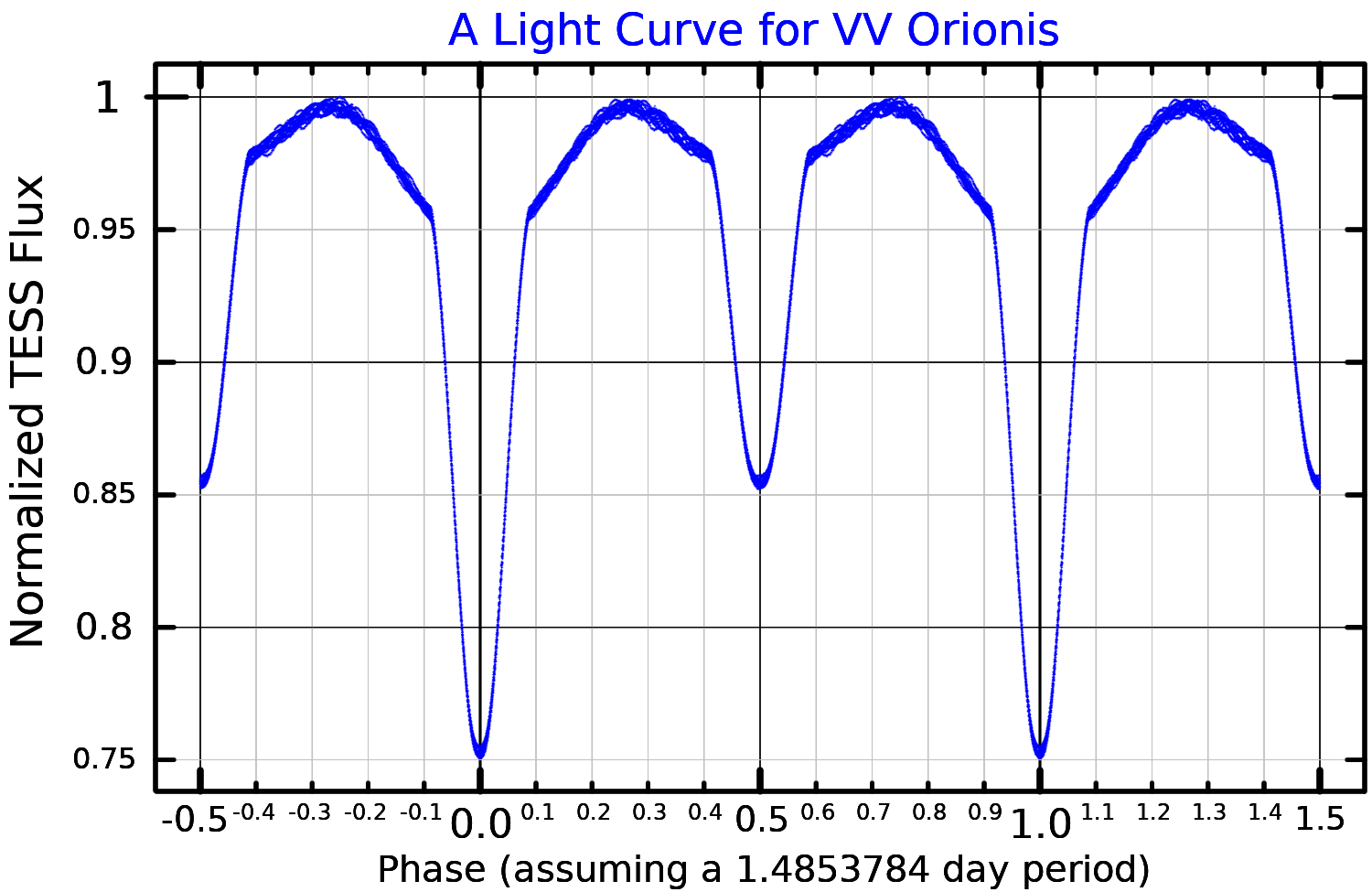
A light curve for VV Orionis, plotted from TESS data

The VV Orionis system contains two stars which are very close but are not touching. Their orbit is aligned almost perpendicularly to us and there are both primary and secondary eclipses. During secondary eclipse, the primary transits against the secondary, which produces the flat bottom to the secondary minimum. The orbital alignment allows very precise calculation of the orbit and the properties of the stars, but results from different studies have been unusually inconsistent. The lack of a single consistent solution to the orbit has led to suggestions that there is a third star in the system, but this is unproven. A circular orbit with the stars only about 14 R_{☉} apart can account for the observed brightness and radial velocity changes, while a third body may explain the decreasing orbital inclination.

The two stars are both on the main sequence. The primary, a β Cephei pulsator, has a spectral type of B1 and temperature of about 26,000 K, while the secondary (possibly a slowly pulsating B-type star) has a spectral type of B7 and a temperature of about 16,000 K. The secondary has a mass of 3.8 M_{☉}, radius of 2.4 R_{☉}, and bolometric luminosity of 340 L_{☉}. The primary is over twice the mass, twice the radius, and thirty times the luminosity of its companion.
