= HD 88133 b =

Hot Jupiter

Discovery
- Discovered by: Fischer, Laughlin, Butler et al.
- Discovery site: California
- Discovery date: September 6, 2004
- Detection method: Radial velocity (N2K Consortium)

Orbital characteristics
- Semi-major axis: 0.0479±0.0032 AU
- Eccentricity: 0 (fixed)
- Orbital period (sidereal): 3.414887±0.000045 d
- Time of periastron: 2463014.948(fixed)
- Argument of periastron: 205.3±3.3
- Semi-amplitude: 32.7±1.0
- Star: HD 88133

HD 88133 b is an extrasolar planet orbiting the star HD 88133. It is probably less massive than Jupiter and even Saturn. It orbits the star in a very tight orbit, completing one revolution around the star in every three and half days or so. Despite the relatively large radius of the star (about 2 times Solar), no transits have been detected.

In 2016 the direct detection of the planetary thermal emission spectrum was claimed, but the detection was questioned in 2021.
