= TX Leonis =

Variable star in the constellation Leo

- Location of TX Leonis (circled in red)

Observation data Epoch J2000.0 Equinox ICRS
- Constellation: Leo
- Right ascension: 10^{h} 35^{m} 02.15893^{s}
- Declination: +08° 39′ 01.5434″
- Apparent magnitude (V): 5.66 - 5.75

Characteristics
- Spectral type: A2V
- B−V color index: 0.059
- Variable type: Algol/detached

Astrometry
Proper motion (μ)	RA: −52.68±0.73 mas/yr Dec.: −4.23±0.46 mas/yr
Parallax (π)	7.61±0.67 mas
Distance	430 ± 40 ly (130 ± 10 pc)
Absolute magnitude (M_{V})	0.458

Orbit
Period (P)	2.4450566 d
Eccentricity (e)	0.060±0.010
Inclination (i)	66.8°
Argument of periastron (ω) (secondary)	295.9±9°
Argument of periastron (ω) (primary)	°

Details

TX Leonis Aa
Mass	2.75±0.12 M_{☉}
Radius	3.49±0.16 R_{☉}
Luminosity	73 L_{☉}
Temperature	8,616 K
Rotational velocity (v sin i)	15 km/s

TX Leonis Ab
Mass	1.05±0.05 M_{☉}
Radius	2.10±0.09 R_{☉}
Luminosity	6.0 L_{☉}
Temperature	6,266 K
Age	850 Myr

B
Mass	1.75 M_{☉}
Surface gravity (log g)	4.24 cgs
Temperature	6,338 K
Metallicity [Fe/H]	−0.24 dex

Other designations
- 49 Leonis, BD+09 2374, HD 91636, HIP 51802, HR 4148, SAO 118380

Database references
SIMBAD	data

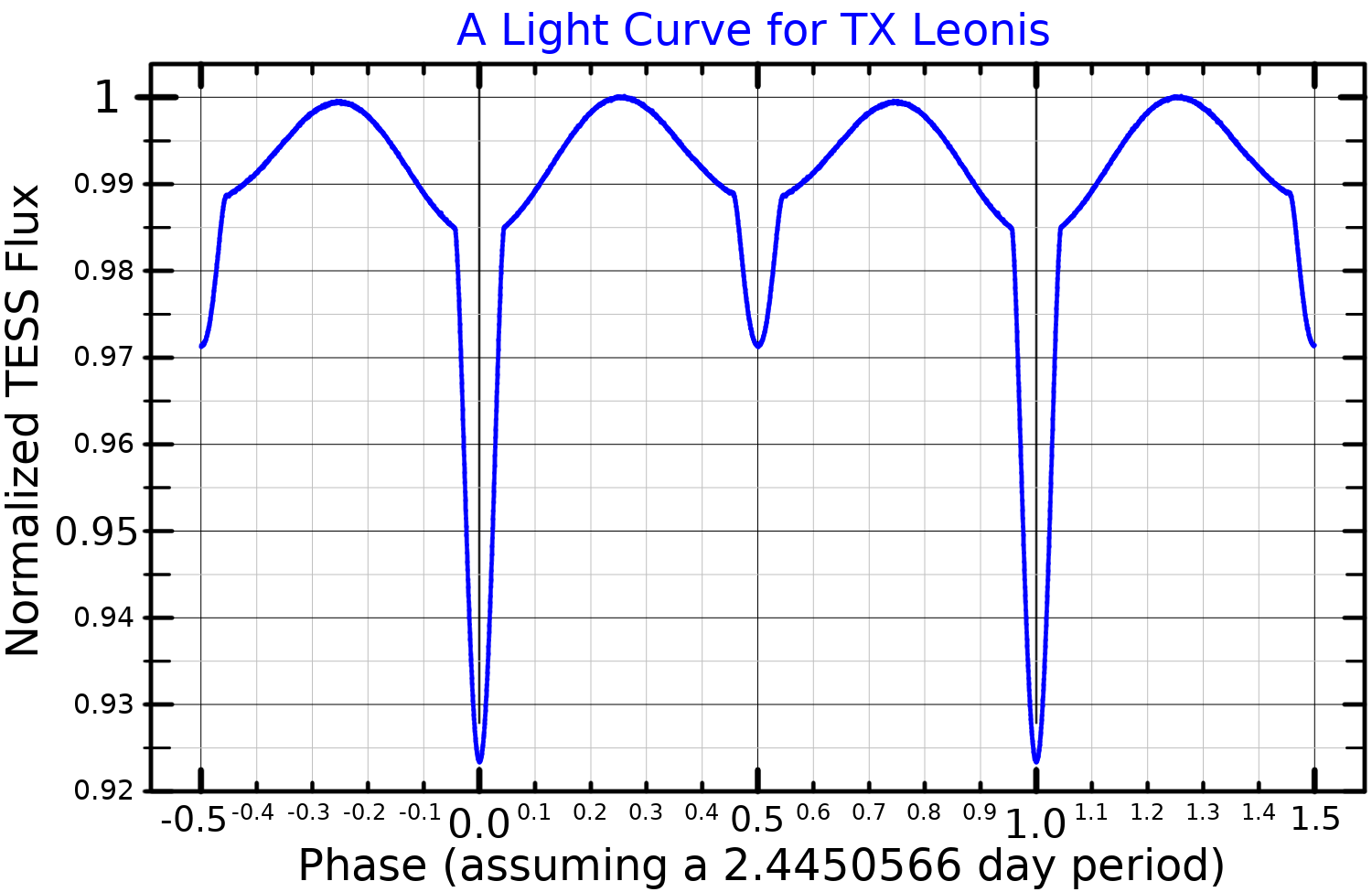
Light curve for TX Leonis, plotted from TESS data

TX Leonis, also known by its Flamsteed designation 49 Leonis, is a triple star system that includes an eclipsing binary, located in the constellation Leo. It was discovered to be a variable star, showing eclipses, by Ernst-Joachim Meyer in 1933. The apparent magnitude of TX Leonis ranges between 5.66 and 5.75, making it faintly visible to the naked eye for an observer located well outside of urban areas. The star's brightness drops by 0.09 and 0.03 magnitudes during the primary and secondary eclipses respectively, and neither the primary nor the secondary eclipse is total.

TX Leonis is a triple star, consisting of magnitude 8.1 star (component B) separated by 2 arc seconds from the brighter eclipsing pair (components Aa and Ab). Although orbital motion has not been detected, the companion shares a common proper motion with the primary star and is at approximately the same distance.

Both stars comprising the eclipsing binary are main sequence stars. Of those two stars, star Aa has been assumed to be 8 times more luminous than star Ab, although newer estimates give the luminosities as 83 L_{☉} and 6 L_{☉} respectively.
