= Baxendell =

Baxendell is a surname. Notable people with the surname include:

- Jos Baxendell (born 1972), English rugby union player and coach
- Joseph Baxendell (1815–1887), English meteorologist and astronomer
- Sir Peter Baxendell (1925–2025), English oil executive
