= WASP-104b =

Hot Jupiter orbiting WASP-104

Discovery
- Discovery date: 2014
- Detection method: transit

Orbital characteristics
- Eccentricity: 0.014^{+0.019}_{−0.010}
- Orbital period (sidereal): 1.75540646±0.00000028 d
- Star: WASP-104

Physical characteristics
- Mean radius: 1.094±0.013R_{J}
- Mass: 1.205^{+0.049}_{−0.044}M_{J}

WASP-104b is a hot Jupiter exoplanet that orbits the star WASP-104. It is considered to be one of the darkest exoplanets discovered. WASP-104b was discovered in 2014; according to a 2018 study at Keele University, the planet's dense atmosphere of potassium and sodium absorbs more than 97% of light it receives.

== Characteristics ==
Researchers have considered WASP-104b to be one of the darkest exoplanets ever discovered. In 2018, scientists from Keele University said the exoplanet's thick sodium and potassium atmosphere can absorb more than 97% of the light that falls on it. A paper published by Cornell University Library describes the exoplanet as "darker than charcoal" and "one of the least reflective planets found to date", even darker than WASP-12b which absorbs 94% of it receives. The only other exoplanet thought to be darker than WASP-104b is TrES-2b. Its reflectance has been compared with that of WASP-12b despite being somewhat darker.

In 2020, a transmission spectroscopy study has indicated that WASP-104b has a red-colored cloud deck and possibly hazes. WASP-104b's size is comparable to that of Jupiter; its mass and radius are 1.272 times and 1.137 times greater than Jupiter's, respectively. It has 12.5 times the mass of Earth and a low density, and may be composed of gas.

WASP-104b is the only known exoplanet to orbit WASP-104, a 3-billion-year-old G8 star. WASP-104b's orbital period is 1.8 days; it is located 2.6 million miles from its star and has an orbital radius of 0.02918 astronomical units (2,712,000 miles). WASP-104 and its planet are located 466 light years away from the Sun in the constellation Leo.
