= 54 Leonis =

Star in the constellation Leo

- Location of 54 Leonis (circled in red)

Observation data Epoch J2000.0 Equinox
Constellation	Leo
- 54 Leo A
Right ascension	10^{h} 55^{m} 36.80266^{s}
Declination	+24° 44′ 59.0440″
- Apparent magnitude (V): 4.477
- 54 Leo B
Right ascension	10^{h} 55^{m} 37.24836^{s}
Declination	+24° 44′ 56.5478″
- Apparent magnitude (V): 6.29

Characteristics

54 Leo A
- Spectral type: A0 V
- B−V color index: +0.001

54 Leo B
- Spectral type: A2 Vn
- B−V color index: +0.07

Astrometry

54 Leo A
Radial velocity (R_{v})	−0.49±0.98 km/s
Proper motion (μ)	RA: −78.057 mas/yr Dec.: −16.520 mas/yr
Parallax (π)	9.8275±0.3537 mas
Distance	330 ± 10 ly (102 ± 4 pc)
Absolute magnitude (M_{V})	–0.29

54 Leo B
Radial velocity (R_{v})	1.30±0.92 km/s
Proper motion (μ)	RA: −75.374 mas/yr Dec.: −18.595 mas/yr
Parallax (π)	10.1748±0.0569 mas
Distance	321 ± 2 ly (98.3 ± 0.5 pc)

Details

54 Leo A
Mass	2.37 M_{☉}
Radius	4.9 R_{☉}
Luminosity	163 L_{☉}
Surface gravity (log g)	3.43 cgs
Temperature	9,337 K
Rotational velocity (v sin i)	185 km/s
Age	411+137 −168 Myr

54 Leo B
Mass	2.23 M_{☉}
Radius	2.02 R_{☉}
Luminosity	22.8 L_{☉}
Surface gravity (log g)	4.17 cgs
Temperature	8,868 K
Rotational velocity (v sin i)	250±20 km/s

Other designations
- 54 Leo, BD+25 2314, CCDM J10556+2445, HIP 53417, Struve 1487
- 54 Leo A: HD 94601, HR 4259, SAO 81583
- 54 Leo B: HD 94602, HR 4260, SAO 81584

Database references
SIMBAD	data
- A
- B

54 Leonis is a binary star system in the zodiac constellation of Leo, located around 321 light years from the Sun. It is visible to the naked eye as a faint, white-hued star with a combined apparent visual magnitude of 4.30. As of 2017, the pair had an angular separation of 6.60″ along a position angle of 113°. They have a physical separation of around 533 AU (79,700 Gm).

The magnitude 4.477 primary, designated component A, is an A-type main-sequence star with a stellar classification of A0 V, which indicates it is generating energy through hydrogen fusion at its core. It has a high rate of spin, showing a projected rotational velocity of 185 km/s. This is giving the star an oblate shape with an equatorial bulge that is an estimated 8% larger than the polar radius. The star is roughly 411 million years old with 2.4 times the mass of the Sun and about 4.9 times the Sun's radius.

The fainter magnitude 6.29 secondary, component B, is a smaller A-type main-sequence star with a class of A2 Vn. The 'n' suffix indicates wide "nebulous" lines due to rapid rotation. It is spinning with an even higher projected rotational velocity of 250 km/s. The star has about twice the Sun's radius.

Asteroid 729 Watsonia occulted HIP 53417 on March 3, 2013 at 01:48.
