= HD 81040 b =

Gas giant

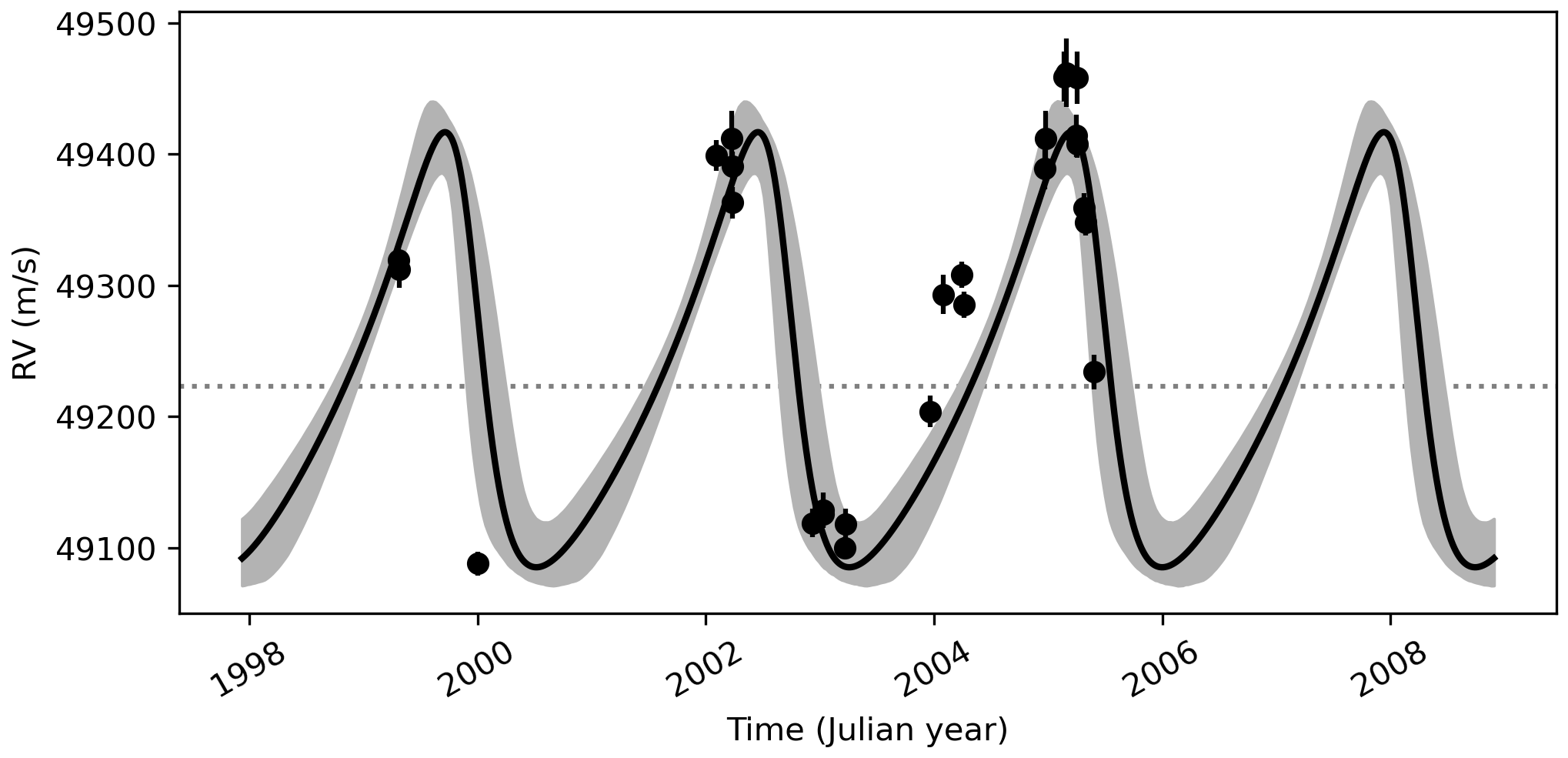
- Radial velocity curve of HD 81040 b

Discovery
- Discovered by: Sozzetti et al.
- Discovery site: Observatoire de Haute-Provence in France
- Discovery date: November 24, 2005
- Detection method: Doppler Spectroscopy

Orbital characteristics
- Semi-major axis: 1.946 ± 0.014 AU (291,100,000 ± 2,100,000 km)
- Eccentricity: 0.525+0.024 −0.026
- Orbital period (sidereal): 1,004.7 ± 3.0 days (2.7507 ± 0.0082 years)
- Inclination: 111.4°+4.4° −4.7°
- Longitude of ascending node: 19.2°+5.0° −4.8°
- Time of periastron: 245511.1+10 −8.7
- Argument of periastron: 73.1°±4.3°
- Semi-amplitude: 168 ± 9
- Star: HD 81040

Physical characteristics
- Mass: 7.53±0.032 M_{J}

HD 81040 b is a massive gas giant exoplanet that orbits the star HD 81040, discovered in 2005 by radial velocity. Its orbital period is just over 1000 days. It has a semimajor axis of about 1.95 AU, and its orbit is quite eccentric, at a little over 0.5.

Astrometry of HD 81040 using Gaia, published in several papers, has determined an orbital inclination of about 111°. This, combined with the minimum mass, gives a true mass of 7.53 M_{J}. Since the inclination is high, there is a small chance that the planet transits.

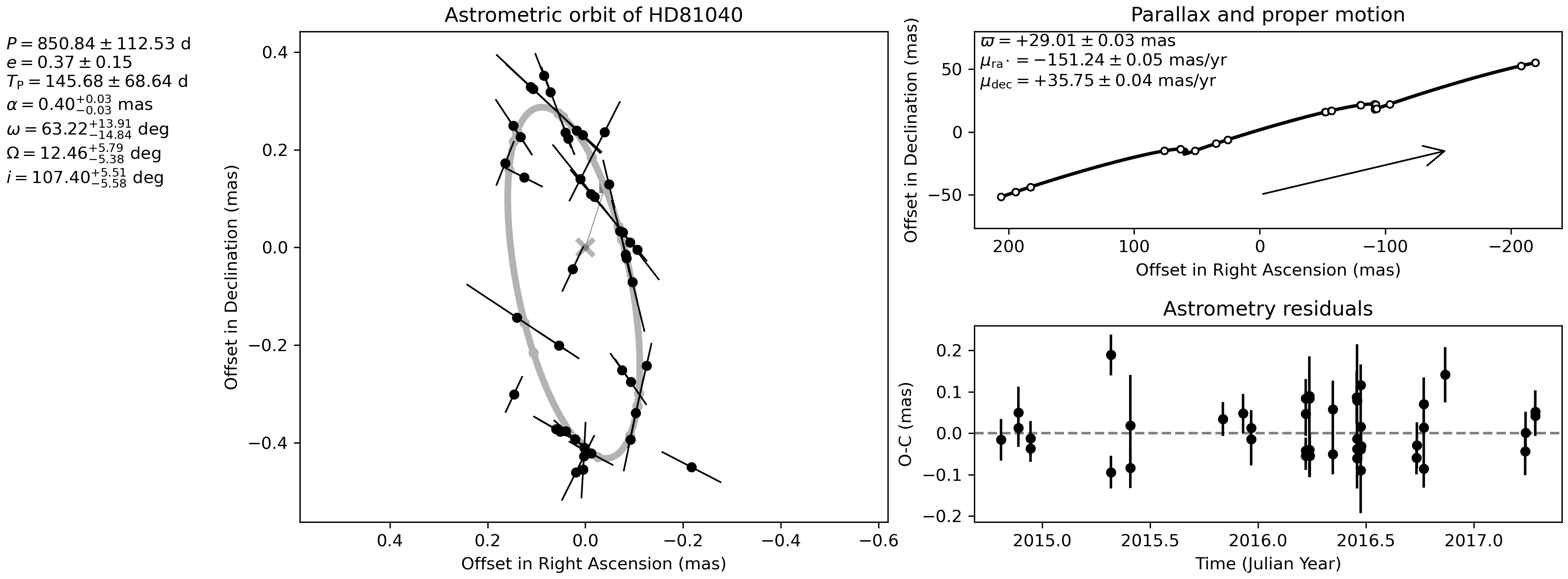
Astrometric orbit of HD 81040 b

== See also ==
- HD 33564 b
