= Mu Leonis =

Star in the constellation Leo

- Location of μ Leonis (circled in red)

Observation data Epoch J2000 Equinox ICRS
- Constellation: Leo
- Right ascension: 09^{h} 52^{m} 45.81654^{s}
- Declination: +26° 00′ 25.0319″
- Apparent magnitude (V): 3.88

Characteristics
- Evolutionary stage: Red giant branch
- Spectral type: K2 IIIb CN1 Ca1
- U−B color index: +1.38
- B−V color index: +1.23

Astrometry
Radial velocity (R_{v})	14.03±0.19 km/s
Proper motion (μ)	RA: −217.31 mas/yr Dec.: −54.26 mas/yr
Parallax (π)	26.28±0.16 mas
Distance	124.1 ± 0.8 ly (38.1 ± 0.2 pc)
Absolute magnitude (M_{V})	+0.83

Details
Mass	1.5±0.1 M_{☉}
Radius	11.74±0.08 R_{☉}
Luminosity	53±1 L_{☉}
Surface gravity (log g)	2.43±0.06 cgs
Temperature	4,519±23 K
Metallicity [Fe/H]	0.27±0.03 dex
Rotational velocity (v sin i)	4.5 km/s
Age	3.35±0.70, ~5.0 Gyr

Other designations
- Rasalas, Alshemali, μ Leo, 24 Leonis, BD+26°2019, HD 85503, HIP 48455, HR 3905, SAO 81064

Database references
SIMBAD	data
Exoplanet Archive	data

Mu Leonis, also named Rasalas /ˈræsəlæs/, is a star in the equatorial-northern constellation of Leo. The apparent visual magnitude of this star is 3.88, which is bright enough to be seen with the naked eye. Based upon an annual parallax shift of 0.02628 arc seconds as measured by the Hipparcos satellite, this system is 124 light-years (38.1 parsecs) from the Sun. In 2014, an exoplanet was discovered to be orbiting the star.

== Nomenclature ==
μ Leonis (Latinised to Mu Leonis, abbreviated Mu Leo, μ Leo) is the star's Bayer designation.

It bore the traditional names Rasalas and Alshemali, both abbreviations of Ras al Asad al Shamaliyy (‘north lion's head’). In 2016, the International Astronomical Union organized a Working Group on Star Names (WGSN) to catalogue and standardize proper names for stars. The WGSN approved the name Rasalas for this star on 12 September 2016 and it is now so included in the List of IAU-approved Star Names.

== Properties ==
Mu Leonis is an evolved K-type red giant star with a stellar classification of K2 IIIb CN1 Ca1. It is believed to be on the red giant branch, where it is fusing hydrogen into helium in a shell surrounding an inert helium core. The trailing notation indicates that, for a star of its type, it has stronger than normal absorption lines of cyanogen and calcium in its spectrum. It has around 1.5 times the Sun's mass and is estimated to be 5 billion years old, older than the Sun's age of 4.6 billion years. Using interferometry with the CHARA Array, its diameter was determined to be 11.74 times that of the Sun. Mu Leonis shines with 57 times the luminosity of the Sun from an outer atmosphere that has an effective temperature of 4,606 K.

== Planetary system ==
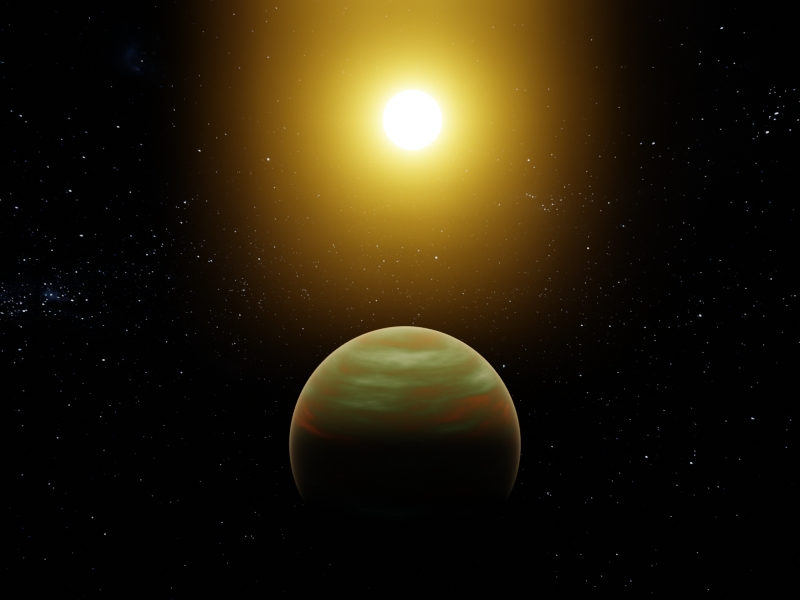
Artistic rendition of Mu Leonis b

In 2014 it was announced that Mu Leonis has a planetary companion that is at least 2.4 times as massive as Jupiter and orbits with a period of 358 days. This planet was detected by measuring radial velocity variations caused by gravitational displacement from the orbiting body.

Later in 2024, a study using astrometry from the Gaia spacecraft found a mass of 12.6 M_{J}, which the authors interpret as a likely upper limit, as the large level of RUWE in the astrometric solution—which could be caused by a companion around the star—might be just the result of systematic calibration errors. This indicates that Mu Leonis b lies in the planetary-mass regime and is not a brown dwarf.

The Mu Leonis system
Companion	Mass	Semimajor axis (AU)	Orbital period	Eccentricity	Discovery year
b	≥2.4±0.4 and ≤12.6 M_{J}	1.1±0.1	357.8±1.2 days	0.09±0.06	2014
