= 83 Leonis Bb =

Hot Neptune

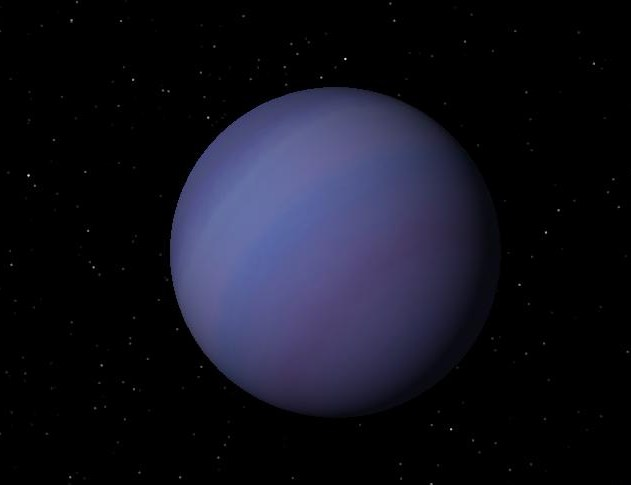
- Hypothetical view of 83 Leonis Bb rendered by Celestia

Discovery
- Discovered by: Marcy, Butler, Vogt et al.
- Discovery site: United States
- Discovery date: 25 January 2005
- Detection method: Doppler spectroscopy

Orbital characteristics
- Semi-major axis: 0.12186 ± 0.00002 AU (18,230,000 ± 3,000 km)
- Eccentricity: 0.13 ± 0.07
- Orbital period (sidereal): 17.054 ± 0.003 d
- Time of periastron: 2,450,449 ± 2
- Argument of periastron: 196 ± 32
- Semi-amplitude: 7.9 ± 0.6
- Star: 83 Leonis B

83 Leonis Bb, also catalogued as HD 99492 b or abbreviated 83 Leo Bb, is an extrasolar planet with a minimum mass of 1.5 Neptune mass. It is located approximately 59 light-years away in the constellation of Leo (the Lion). The planet was discovered in January 2005 by the California and Carnegie Planet Search team, who use the Doppler spectroscopy method to detect planets. It orbits in a close orbit around the star, completing one orbit in about 17 days. The HARPS-N spectrograph discovered a second Neptune-like exoplanet in 2022 orbiting at 95 days.

== See also ==
- 16 Cygni Bb
