= Chi Leonis =

Double star system in the constellation Leo

χ Leonis
- Location of χ Leonis (circled in red)

Observation data Epoch J2000.0 Equinox ICRS
- Constellation: Leo
- Right ascension: 11^{h} 05^{m} 01.02754^{s}
- Declination: +07° 20′ 09.6235″
- Apparent magnitude (V): 4.63

Characteristics
- Evolutionary stage: Main sequence
- Spectral type: F2III-IVv
- U−B color index: +0.06
- B−V color index: +0.33

Astrometry
Radial velocity (R_{v})	+4.7 km/s
Proper motion (μ)	RA: −344.28 mas/yr Dec.: −47.65 mas/yr
Parallax (π)	34.49±0.20 mas
Distance	94.6 ± 0.5 ly (29.0 ± 0.2 pc)
Absolute magnitude (M_{V})	+2.31

Details
Mass	1.62 M_{☉}
Radius	1.99 R_{☉}
Luminosity	9.9 L_{☉}
Surface gravity (log g)	4.02 cgs
Temperature	7022±80 K
Metallicity [Fe/H]	+0.03 dex
Rotational velocity (v sin i)	25±1 km/s
Age	1.40 Gyr

Other designations
- χ Leo, 63 Leo, BD+08°2455, FK5 418, HD 96097, HIP 54182, HR 4310, SAO 118648

Database references
SIMBAD	data

Chi Leonis, Latinized from χ Leonis, is a double star in the constellation Leo. It is visible to the naked eye with an apparent visual magnitude of 4.63. The distance to this star, as determined using parallax measurements, is around 95 light years. It has an annual proper motion of 346 mas.

This is most likely a binary star system. The primary component has a stellar classification of F2III-IVv, which at first would classify it as a F-type star between the giant and subgiant evolutionary stages, but evolutionary models suggest the star is instead in the main sequence. It has an estimated 162% of the Sun's mass and nearly twice the Sun's radius. The companion is a magnitude 11.0 star at an angular separation of 4.1″ along a position angle of 264°, as of 1990.

== Observation ==
On 18 October 2015, it was occulted by Mars as viewed from East Asia and Japan.
