= 58 Leonis =

Star in the constellation Leo

- Location of 58 Leonis (circled in red)

Observation data Epoch J2000 Equinox J2000
- Constellation: Leo
- Right ascension: 11^{h} 00^{m} 33.64811^{s}
- Declination: +03° 37′ 02.9766″
- Apparent magnitude (V): 4.852

Characteristics
- Spectral type: K0.5 III Fe-0.5
- B−V color index: 1.163

Astrometry
Radial velocity (R_{v})	+5.98 km/s
Proper motion (μ)	RA: +14.82 mas/yr Dec.: −16.51 mas/yr
Parallax (π)	9.05±0.20 mas
Distance	360 ± 8 ly (110 ± 2 pc)
Absolute magnitude (M_{V})	−1.04

Details
Mass	1.89 M_{☉}
Luminosity	182 L_{☉}
Surface gravity (log g)	1.8 cgs
Temperature	4,519±52 K
Metallicity [Fe/H]	−0.16±0.10 dex
Age	1.69 Gyr

Other designations
- 58 Leo, BD+04°2407, FK5 1284, HD 95345, HIP 53807, HR 4291, SAO 118610, CCDM J11006+0337AB

Database references
SIMBAD	data

58 Leonis is a possible binary star system in the southern part of the constellation of Leo, near the border with Sextans. It shines with an apparent magnitude of 4.85, making it bright enough to be seen with the naked eye. An annual parallax shift of 9.05±0.20 mas yields a distance estimate of 360 light-years. It is moving further from the Sun with a heliocentric radial velocity of +6 km/s.

This orange hued star is an evolved K-type giant with a stellar classification of K0.5 III Fe-0.5, indicating a mild underabundance of iron in its spectrum. It was identified as a barium star by P. M. Williams (1971). These are theorized to be stars that show an enrichment of s-process elements by mass transfer from a now-white dwarf companion when it passed through the asymptotic giant branch stage. MacConnell et al. (1972) classified 58 Leonis as a marginal barium star. De Castro et al. (2016) consider this to be only a probable barium star, because of the low degree of s-process enrichment, and they rejected it from their sample. Rather than having an evolved companion, it may instead have formed from a cloud that was mildly enriched with s-process elements.
