= Pi Leonis =

Star in the constellation Leo

π Leonis
- Location of π Leonis (circled in red)

Observation data Epoch J2000.0 Equinox ICRS
- Constellation: Leo
- Right ascension: 10^{h} 00^{m} 12.80589^{s}
- Declination: +08° 02′ 39.2032″
- Apparent magnitude (V): 4.70

Characteristics
- Evolutionary stage: AGB
- Spectral type: M2 III
- U−B color index: +1.88
- B−V color index: +1.60

Astrometry
Radial velocity (R_{v})	22.36±0.29 km/s
Proper motion (μ)	RA: −31.41 mas/yr Dec.: −22.15 mas/yr
Parallax (π)	8.03±0.29 mas
Distance	410 ± 10 ly (125 ± 4 pc)
Absolute magnitude (M_{V})	−0.79

Details
Mass	1.64 M_{☉}
Radius	84.7 R_{☉}
Luminosity	1,077±73 L_{☉}
Surface gravity (log g)	1.028 cgs
Temperature	3,757 K
Metallicity [Fe/H]	+0.447 dex

Other designations
- π Leo, 29 Leonis, BD+08°2301, HD 86663, HIP 49029, HR 3950, SAO 118044

Database references
SIMBAD	data

Pi Leonis, Latinised from π Leonis, is a single star in the zodiac constellation Leo. It is a red-hued star that is visible to the naked eye with an apparent visual magnitude of 4.70. This object is located at a distance of some 410 light-years from the Sun based on parallax, and is drifting further away with a radial velocity of +22 km/s. Because the star lies near the ecliptic it is subject to occultations by the Moon.

This is an evolved, red giant star with a stellar classification of M2 III. With the supply of hydrogen at its core exhausted, it has expanded to 70 times the Sun's radius. The star shines with 1,077 times the luminosity of the Sun from an expanded outer atmosphere that has an effective temperature of 3,757 K. According to the General Catalogue of Variable Stars, it is a suspected variable star with a maximum magnitude of 4.67.
