= 61 Leonis =

Binary star in the constellation Leo

- Location of 61 Leonis (circled in red)

Observation data Epoch J2000 Equinox J2000
- Constellation: Leo
- Right ascension: 11^{h} 01^{m} 49.67462^{s}
- Declination: −02° 29′ 04.5007″
- Apparent magnitude (V): 4.73

Characteristics
- Evolutionary stage: AGB
- Spectral type: M0 III
- B−V color index: +1.593±0.059
- Variable type: suspected

Astrometry
Radial velocity (R_{v})	−12.7±0.3 km/s
Proper motion (μ)	RA: +9.76 mas/yr Dec.: −35.56 mas/yr
Parallax (π)	5.58±0.24 mas
Distance	580 ± 30 ly (179 ± 8 pc)
Absolute magnitude (M_{V})	−1.53

Details
Radius	74.5 R_{☉}
Luminosity	1,377.86 L_{☉}
Surface gravity (log g)	1.25±0.23 cgs
Temperature	3,864±30 K
Metallicity [Fe/H]	0.07±0.07 dex

Other designations
- p^{2} Leo, 61 Leo, NSV 5059, BD−01°2471, FK5 2879, HD 95578, HIP 53907, HR 4299, SAO 137947

Database references
SIMBAD	data

61 Leonis is a possible binary star system in the zodiac constellation of Leo. It is faintly visible to the naked eye, having an apparent visual magnitude of 4.73. The star is moving closer to the Sun with a heliocentric radial velocity of −12.7 km/s. It is located roughly 580 light-years from the Sun, as determined from its annual parallax shift of 5.58 mas.

This is an evolved red giant star with a stellar classification of M0 III that Eggen (1992) listed as being on the asymptotic giant branch (AGB). It is a marginal barium star, showing an enhanced abundance of s-process elements in its outer atmosphere. This material may have been acquired during a previous mass transfer from a now white dwarf companion, or self-enriched by a dredge-up during the AGB process. The measured angular diameter after correctly for limb darkening is 3.87±0.04 mas, which, at the estimated distance of this system yields a physical size of about 74.5 times the radius of the Sun.

61 Leonis is a suspected variable star with apparent magnitude changing between 4.69 and 4.79. The variability was reported in a 1966 photometric survey, but has not been confirmed by more recent photometry.
