= Algol variable =

Class of eclipsing binary stars

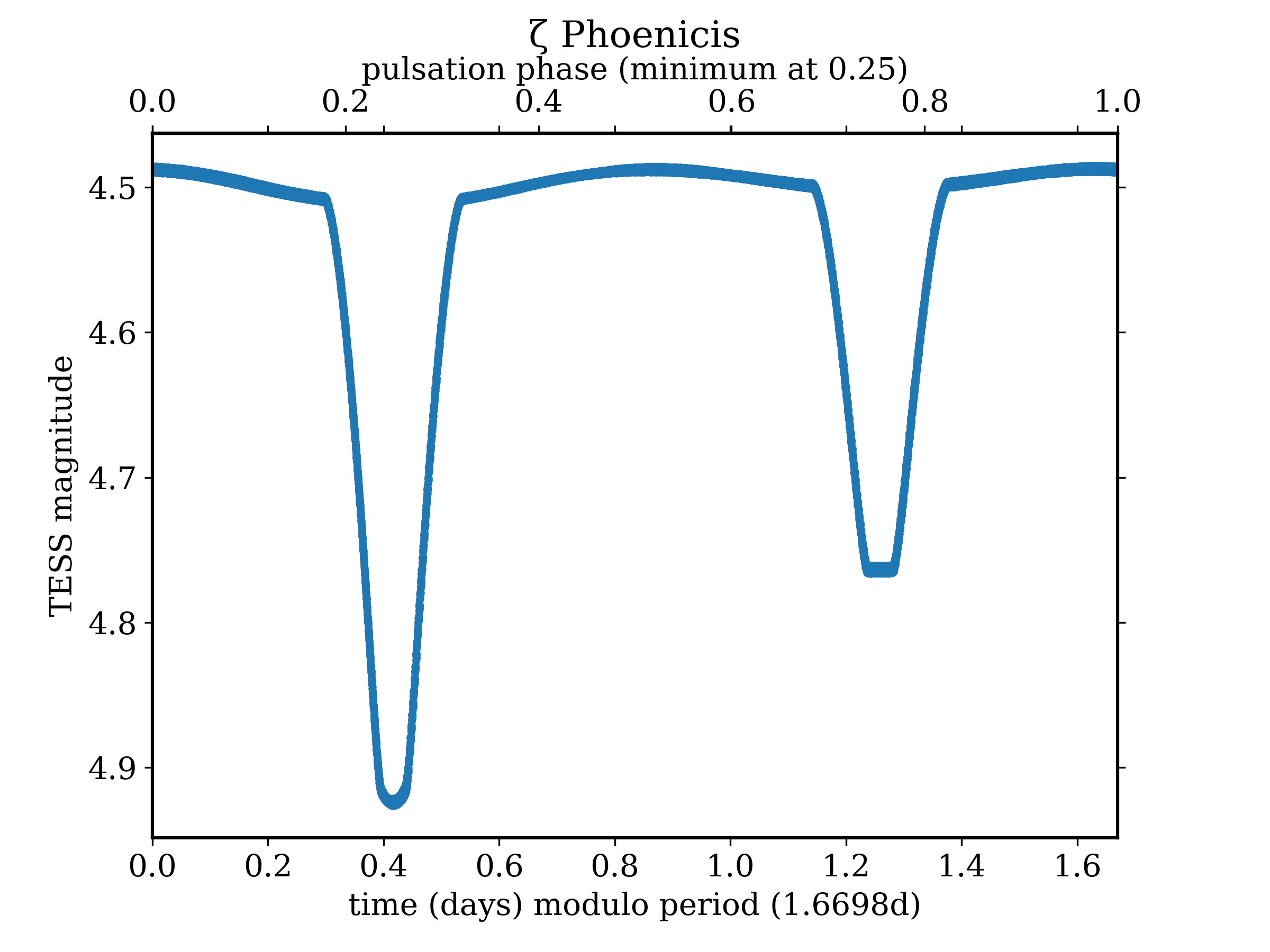
Phase-folded light curve of the Algol variable Zeta Phoenicis recorded by NASA's Transiting Exoplanet Survey Satellite (TESS)

Algol variables or Algol-type binaries are a class of eclipsing binary stars that are similar to the prototype member of this class, β Persei (Beta Persei, Algol). An Algol binary is a system where both stars are near-spherical such that the timing of the start and end of the eclipses is well-defined. The primary is generally a main sequence star well within its Roche lobe. The secondary may also be a main sequence star, referred to as a detached binary or it may be an evolved star filling its Roche lobe, referred to as a semidetached binary.

When the cooler component passes in front of the hotter one, part of the latter's light is blocked, and the total brightness of the binary, as viewed from Earth, temporarily decreases. This is the primary minimum of the binary. Total brightness may also decrease, but less so, when the hotter component passes in front of the cooler one; this is the secondary minimum.

The period, or time span between two primary minima, is very regular over moderate periods of time (months to years), being determined by the revolution period of the binary, the time it takes for the two components to once orbit around each other. Most Algol variables are quite close binaries, and therefore their periods are short, typically a few days. The shortest known period is 0.1167 days (~2:48 hours, HW Virginis); the longest is 9892 days (27 years, Epsilon Aurigae). Over long periods of time, various effects can cause the period to vary: in some Algol binaries, mass transfer between the closely spaced components of the variable may cause monotonic increases in period; if one component of the pair is magnetically active, the Applegate mechanism may cause recurrent changes in period on the order of ∆P/P ≈ 10^{−5}; magnetic braking or the effects of a third component star in a highly eccentric orbit can cause larger changes in period.

Component stars of Algol binary systems have a spherical, or slightly ellipsoidal shape. This distinguishes them from the so-called beta Lyrae variables and W Ursae Majoris variables, where the two components are so close that gravitational effects lead to serious deformations of both stars.

Generally the amplitudes of the brightness variations are of the order of one magnitude, the largest variation known being 3.4 magnitudes (V342 Aquilae). The components may have any spectral type, though in most cases the brighter component is found to have a B, A, F, or G class.

Algol itself, the prototype of this type of variable star, Bayer designation Beta Persei, first had its variability recorded in 1667 by Geminiano Montanari. The mechanism for its being variable was first correctly explained by John Goodricke in 1782.

Many thousands of Algol binaries are now known: the latest edition of the General Catalogue of Variable Stars (2003) lists 3,554 of them (9% of all variable stars).

Designation (name)	Constellation	Discovery	Apparent magnitude (Maximum) (Note: (visual magnitude, unless marked (B) (= blue) or (p) (= photographic)))	Apparent magnitude (Minimum) (Note: (visual magnitude, unless marked (B) (= blue) or (p) (= photographic)))	Range of magnitude	Period	Subtype	Spectral types (eclipsing components)	Comment
ε Aur (Almaaz)	Auriga	J.H. Fritsch, 1821	2^{m}.92	3^{m}.83	0.91	27.08 years	GS	F0 Iab + ~ B5V	
U Cep	Cepheus		6^{m}.75	9^{m}.24	2.49	2.49305 d			
R CMa	Canis Major		5^{m}.70	6^{m}.34	0.64	1.13594 d	SD		triple system
S Cnc	Cancer	Hind, 1848	8^{m}.29	10^{m}.25	1.96	9.48455 d	DS		
α CrB (Alphecca or Gemma)	Corona Borealis		2^{m}.21 (B)	2^{m}.32 (B)	0.11	17.35991 d	DM	A0V + G5V	
U CrB	Corona Borealis		7^{m}.66	8^{m}.79	1.13	3.45220 d	SD		
u Her (68 Her)	Hercules		4^{m}.69	5^{m}.37	0.68	2.05103 d	SD		
VW Hya	Hydra		10^{m}.5	14^{m}.1	3.6	2.69642 d	SD		
δ Ori (Mintaka)	Orion	John Herschel, 1834	2^{m}.14	2^{m}.26	0.12	5.73248 d	DM	O9.5 II + B0.5III	
VV Ori	Orion		5^{m}.31	5^{m}.66	0.35	1.48538 d	KE		
β Per (Algol)	Perseus	Geminiano Montanari, 1669	2^{m}.12	3^{m}.39	1.27	2.86730 d	SD	B8V + K0IV	prototype, triple system
ζ Phe (Wurren)	Phoenix		3^{m}.91	4^{m}.42	0.51	1.66977 d	DM	B6 V + B9 V	probable quadruple system
U Sge	Sagitta		6^{m}.45	9^{m}.28	2.83	3.38062 d	SD		
λ Tau (Bibing)	Taurus	Baxendell, 1848	3^{m}.37	3^{m}.91	0.54	3.95295 d	DM	B3 V + A4 IV	triple system
δ Vel (Alsephina)	Vela	Otero, Fieseler, 2000	1^{m}.96	2^{m}.39	0.43	45.15 d	DM	A2 IV + A4 V	triple, probable quintuple system
TX Leonis	Leo	Meyer, Ernst-Joachim, 1933	5^{m}.66	5^{m}.75	0.09	2.445 d	DM	A2V	triple system
BL Tel	Telescopium	Luyten, 1935	7^{m}.09	8^{m}.08	0.99	778 d	GS	F4Ib+M	one component may be variable

- DM = A detached main-sequence system. Both components are main-sequence stars and neither fills their inner Roche lobe
- DS = A detached system with a subgiant. The subgiant does not fill its inner critical surface
- GS = A system with one or both giant and supergiant components; one of the components may be a main sequence star
- KE = A contact system of early (O-A) spectral type, both components being close in size to their inner critical surfaces.
- SD = A semidetached system. One star fills its Roche lobe.
