= Leo in Chinese astronomy =

The modern constellation Leo lies across one of the quadrants symbolized by the Vermilion Bird of the South (南方朱雀, Nán Fāng Zhū Què), and Three Enclosures (三垣, Sān Yuán), that divide the sky in traditional Chinese uranography.

The name of the western constellation in modern Chinese is 狮子座 (shī zi zuò), which means "the lion constellation".

== Stars ==
The map of Chinese constellation in constellation Leo area consists of :

Enclosures	Enclosure (Chinese name)	Romanization	Translation	Asterisms (Chinese name)	Romanization	Translation	Western star name	Proper Name	Chinese star name	Romanization	Translation
Three Enclosures (三垣)	太微垣	Tài Wēi Yuán	Supreme Palace enclosure	太微右垣	Tàiwēiyòuyuán	Right Wall					
Three Enclosures (三垣)	太微垣	Tài Wēi Yuán	Supreme Palace enclosure	太微右垣	Tàiwēiyòuyuán	Right Wall	σ Leo				
Three Enclosures (三垣)	太微垣	Tài Wēi Yuán	Supreme Palace enclosure	太微右垣	Tàiwēiyòuyuán	Right Wall	σ Leo		太微右垣二	Tàiwēiyòuyuánèr	2nd star
Three Enclosures (三垣)	太微垣	Tài Wēi Yuán	Supreme Palace enclosure	太微右垣	Tàiwēiyòuyuán	Right Wall	σ Leo		西上將	Xīshǎngjiāng	The First Western General
Three Enclosures (三垣)	太微垣	Tài Wēi Yuán	Supreme Palace enclosure	太微右垣	Tàiwēiyòuyuán	Right Wall	σ Leo		西太阳門	Xītàiyángmén	First gate in the west
Three Enclosures (三垣)	太微垣	Tài Wēi Yuán	Supreme Palace enclosure	太微右垣	Tàiwēiyòuyuán	Right Wall	ι Leo				
Three Enclosures (三垣)	太微垣	Tài Wēi Yuán	Supreme Palace enclosure	太微右垣	Tàiwēiyòuyuán	Right Wall	ι Leo		太微右垣三	Tàiwēiyòuyuánsān	3rd star
Three Enclosures (三垣)	太微垣	Tài Wēi Yuán	Supreme Palace enclosure	太微右垣	Tàiwēiyòuyuán	Right Wall	ι Leo		西次將	Xīcìjiāng	The Second Western General
Three Enclosures (三垣)	太微垣	Tài Wēi Yuán	Supreme Palace enclosure	太微右垣	Tàiwēiyòuyuán	Right Wall	ι Leo		中华西門	Zhōnghuáxīmén	Middle gate in the west
Three Enclosures (三垣)	太微垣	Tài Wēi Yuán	Supreme Palace enclosure	太微右垣	Tàiwēiyòuyuán	Right Wall	θ Leo	Chertan			
Three Enclosures (三垣)	太微垣	Tài Wēi Yuán	Supreme Palace enclosure	太微右垣	Tàiwēiyòuyuán	Right Wall	θ Leo	Chertan	太微右垣四	Tàiwēiyòuyuánsì	4th star
Three Enclosures (三垣)	太微垣	Tài Wēi Yuán	Supreme Palace enclosure	太微右垣	Tàiwēiyòuyuán	Right Wall	θ Leo	Chertan	西次相	Xīcìxiāng	The Second Western Minister
Three Enclosures (三垣)	太微垣	Tài Wēi Yuán	Supreme Palace enclosure	太微右垣	Tàiwēiyòuyuán	Right Wall	θ Leo	Chertan	西太阴門	Xītàiyīnmén	Final gate in the west
Three Enclosures (三垣)	太微垣	Tài Wēi Yuán	Supreme Palace enclosure	太微右垣	Tàiwēiyòuyuán	Right Wall	δ Leo	Zosma			
Three Enclosures (三垣)	太微垣	Tài Wēi Yuán	Supreme Palace enclosure	太微右垣	Tàiwēiyòuyuán	Right Wall	δ Leo	Zosma	太微右垣五	Tàiwēiyòuyuánwu	5th star
Three Enclosures (三垣)	太微垣	Tài Wēi Yuán	Supreme Palace enclosure	太微右垣	Tàiwēiyòuyuán	Right Wall	δ Leo	Zosma	西上相	Xīshǎngxiāng	The First Western Minister
Three Enclosures (三垣)	太微垣	Tài Wēi Yuán	Supreme Palace enclosure	太微右垣	Tàiwēiyòuyuán	Right Wall	81 Leo		西次相增二	Xīcìxiāngzēngèr	2nd additional star of The Second Western Minister
Three Enclosures (三垣)	太微垣	Tài Wēi Yuán	Supreme Palace enclosure	太微右垣	Tàiwēiyòuyuán	Right Wall	73 Leo		西次相增三	Xīcìxiāngzēngsān	3rd additional star of The Second Western Minister
Three Enclosures (三垣)	太微垣	Tài Wēi Yuán	Supreme Palace enclosure	太微右垣	Tàiwēiyòuyuán	Right Wall	60 Leo		西上相增一	Xīshǎngxiāngzēngyī	1st additional star of The First Western Minister
Three Enclosures (三垣)	太微垣	Tài Wēi Yuán	Supreme Palace enclosure	太微右垣	Tàiwēiyòuyuán	Right Wall	86 Leo		西上相增二	Xīshǎngxiāngzēngèr	2nd additional star of The First Western Minister
Three Enclosures (三垣)	太微垣	Tài Wēi Yuán	Supreme Palace enclosure	五帝座	Wǔdìzuò	Seats of the Five Emperors					
Three Enclosures (三垣)	太微垣	Tài Wēi Yuán	Supreme Palace enclosure	五帝座	Wǔdìzuò	Seats of the Five Emperors	β Leo	Denebola			
Three Enclosures (三垣)	太微垣	Tài Wēi Yuán	Supreme Palace enclosure	五帝座	Wǔdìzuò	Seats of the Five Emperors	β Leo	Denebola	五帝座一	Wǔdìzuòyī	1st star
Three Enclosures (三垣)	太微垣	Tài Wēi Yuán	Supreme Palace enclosure	五帝座	Wǔdìzuò	Seats of the Five Emperors	β Leo	Denebola	五帝座中星	Wǔdìzuòzhōngxīng	Center star
Three Enclosures (三垣)	太微垣	Tài Wēi Yuán	Supreme Palace enclosure	五帝座	Wǔdìzuò	Seats of the Five Emperors	β Leo	Denebola	黄帝座	Huángdìzuò	Seat of King Huang
Three Enclosures (三垣)	太微垣	Tài Wēi Yuán	Supreme Palace enclosure	五帝座	Wǔdìzuò	Seats of the Five Emperors	HD 102660		五帝座二	Wǔdìzuòyèr	2nd star
Three Enclosures (三垣)	太微垣	Tài Wēi Yuán	Supreme Palace enclosure	五帝座	Wǔdìzuò	Seats of the Five Emperors	HD 102103		五帝座三	Wǔdìzuòsān	3rd star
Three Enclosures (三垣)	太微垣	Tài Wēi Yuán	Supreme Palace enclosure	五帝座	Wǔdìzuò	Seats of the Five Emperors	95 Leo		五帝座四	Wǔdìzuòsì	4th star
Three Enclosures (三垣)	太微垣	Tài Wēi Yuán	Supreme Palace enclosure	五帝座	Wǔdìzuò	Seats of the Five Emperors	HD 102910		五帝座五	Wǔdìzuòwu	5th star
Three Enclosures (三垣)	太微垣	Tài Wēi Yuán	Supreme Palace enclosure	五帝座	Wǔdìzuò	Seats of the Five Emperors	90 Leo		五帝座增一	Wǔdìzuòzēngyī	1st additional star
Three Enclosures (三垣)	太微垣	Tài Wēi Yuán	Supreme Palace enclosure	五帝座	Wǔdìzuò	Seats of the Five Emperors	85 Leo		五帝座增二	Wǔdìzuòzēngèr	2nd additional star
Three Enclosures (三垣)	太微垣	Tài Wēi Yuán	Supreme Palace enclosure	五帝座	Wǔdìzuò	Seats of the Five Emperors	88 Leo		五帝座增三	Wǔdìzuòzēngsān	3rd additional star
Three Enclosures (三垣)	太微垣	Tài Wēi Yuán	Supreme Palace enclosure	五帝座	Wǔdìzuò	Seats of the Five Emperors	HD 102103		五帝座增四	Wǔdìzuòzēngsì	4th additional star
Three Enclosures (三垣)	太微垣	Tài Wēi Yuán	Supreme Palace enclosure	太子	Tàizǐ	Crown Prince	93 Leo		太子	Tàizǐ	(One star of)
Three Enclosures (三垣)	太微垣	Tài Wēi Yuán	Supreme Palace enclosure	從官	Cóngguān	Retinue	92 Leo				
Three Enclosures (三垣)	太微垣	Tài Wēi Yuán	Supreme Palace enclosure	從官	Cóngguān	Retinue	92 Leo		從官	Cóngguān	(One star of)
Three Enclosures (三垣)	太微垣	Tài Wēi Yuán	Supreme Palace enclosure	從官	Cóngguān	Retinue	92 Leo		子西星	Zǐxīxīng	Star of Zixi
Three Enclosures (三垣)	太微垣	Tài Wēi Yuán	Supreme Palace enclosure	虎賁	Hǔbēn	Emperor’s Bodyguard	72 Leo		虎賁	Hǔbēn	(One star of)
Three Enclosures (三垣)	太微垣	Tài Wēi Yuán	Supreme Palace enclosure	明堂	Míngtáng	The Hall of Glory					
Three Enclosures (三垣)	太微垣	Tài Wēi Yuán	Supreme Palace enclosure	明堂	Míngtáng	The Hall of Glory	τ Leo		明堂一	Míngtángyī	1st star
Three Enclosures (三垣)	太微垣	Tài Wēi Yuán	Supreme Palace enclosure	明堂	Míngtáng	The Hall of Glory	υ Leo		明堂二	Míngtángèr	2nd star
Three Enclosures (三垣)	太微垣	Tài Wēi Yuán	Supreme Palace enclosure	明堂	Míngtáng	The Hall of Glory	87 Leo		明堂三	Míngtángsān	3rd star
Three Enclosures (三垣)	太微垣	Tài Wēi Yuán	Supreme Palace enclosure	明堂	Míngtáng	The Hall of Glory	89 Leo		明堂增一	Míngtángzēngyī	1st additional star
Three Enclosures (三垣)	太微垣	Tài Wēi Yuán	Supreme Palace enclosure	明堂	Míngtáng	The Hall of Glory	80 Leo		明堂增二	Míngtángzēngèr	2nd additional star
Three Enclosures (三垣)	太微垣	Tài Wēi Yuán	Supreme Palace enclosure	明堂	Míngtáng	The Hall of Glory	79 Leo		明堂增三	Míngtángzēngsān	3rd additional star
Three Enclosures (三垣)	太微垣	Tài Wēi Yuán	Supreme Palace enclosure	明堂	Míngtáng	The Hall of Glory	75 Leo		明堂增四	Míngtángzēngsì	4th additional star
Three Enclosures (三垣)	太微垣	Tài Wēi Yuán	Supreme Palace enclosure	明堂	Míngtáng	The Hall of Glory	69 Leo		明堂增五	Míngtángzēngwǔ	5th additional star
Three Enclosures (三垣)	太微垣	Tài Wēi Yuán	Supreme Palace enclosure	明堂	Míngtáng	The Hall of Glory	φ Leo		明堂增六	Míngtángzēngliù	6th additional star
Three Enclosures (三垣)	太微垣	Tài Wēi Yuán	Supreme Palace enclosure	靈台	Língtái	Astronomical Observatory					
Three Enclosures (三垣)	太微垣	Tài Wēi Yuán	Supreme Palace enclosure	靈台	Língtái	Astronomical Observatory	χ Leo		靈台一	Língtáiyī	1st star
Three Enclosures (三垣)	太微垣	Tài Wēi Yuán	Supreme Palace enclosure	靈台	Língtái	Astronomical Observatory	59 Leo		靈台二	Língtáièr	2nd star
Three Enclosures (三垣)	太微垣	Tài Wēi Yuán	Supreme Palace enclosure	靈台	Língtái	Astronomical Observatory	58 Leo		靈台三	Língtáisān	3rd star
Three Enclosures (三垣)	太微垣	Tài Wēi Yuán	Supreme Palace enclosure	靈台	Língtái	Astronomical Observatory	56 Leo		靈台增一	Língtáizēngyī	1st additional star
Three Enclosures (三垣)	太微垣	Tài Wēi Yuán	Supreme Palace enclosure	靈台	Língtái	Astronomical Observatory	55 Leo		靈台增三	Língtáizēngsān	3rd additional star
Three Enclosures (三垣)	太微垣	Tài Wēi Yuán	Supreme Palace enclosure	靈台	Língtái	Astronomical Observatory	57 Leo		靈台增四	Língtáizēngsì	4th additional star
Three Enclosures (三垣)	太微垣	Tài Wēi Yuán	Supreme Palace enclosure	靈台	Língtái	Astronomical Observatory	61 Leo		靈台增五	Língtáizēngwǔ	5th additional star
Three Enclosures (三垣)	太微垣	Tài Wēi Yuán	Supreme Palace enclosure	靈台	Língtái	Astronomical Observatory	66 Leo		靈台增六	Língtáizēngliù	6th additional star
Three Enclosures (三垣)	太微垣	Tài Wēi Yuán	Supreme Palace enclosure	靈台	Língtái	Astronomical Observatory	62 Leo		靈台增七	Língtáizēngqī	7th additional star
Three Enclosures (三垣)	太微垣	Tài Wēi Yuán	Supreme Palace enclosure	靈台	Língtái	Astronomical Observatory	65 Leo		靈台增八	Língtáizēngbā	8th additional star
Three Enclosures (三垣)	太微垣	Tài Wēi Yuán	Supreme Palace enclosure	少微	Shǎowēi	Junior Officers					
Three Enclosures (三垣)	太微垣	Tài Wēi Yuán	Supreme Palace enclosure	少微	Shǎowēi	Junior Officers	52 LMi		少微一	Shǎowēiyī	1st star
Three Enclosures (三垣)	太微垣	Tài Wēi Yuán	Supreme Palace enclosure	少微	Shǎowēi	Junior Officers	54 Leo A		少微二	Shǎowēièr	2nd star
Three Enclosures (三垣)	太微垣	Tài Wēi Yuán	Supreme Palace enclosure	少微	Shǎowēi	Junior Officers	51 Leo		少微四	Shǎowēisì	4th star
Three Enclosures (三垣)	太微垣	Tài Wēi Yuán	Supreme Palace enclosure	少微	Shǎowēi	Junior Officers	67 Leo		少微增六	Shǎowēizēngliù	6th additional star
Three Enclosures (三垣)	太微垣	Tài Wēi Yuán	Supreme Palace enclosure	少微	Shǎowēi	Junior Officers	64 Leo		少微增七	Shǎowēizēngqī	7th additional star
Three Enclosures (三垣)	太微垣	Tài Wēi Yuán	Supreme Palace enclosure	少微	Shǎowēi	Junior Officers	HD 94671		少微增八	Shǎowēizēngbā	8th additional star
Three Enclosures (三垣)	太微垣	Tài Wēi Yuán	Supreme Palace enclosure	少微	Shǎowēi	Junior Officers	54 Leo B		少微增九	Shǎowēizēngjiǔ	9th additional star
Three Enclosures (三垣)	太微垣	Tài Wēi Yuán	Supreme Palace enclosure	長垣	Chángyuán	Long Wall					
Three Enclosures (三垣)	太微垣	Tài Wēi Yuán	Supreme Palace enclosure	長垣	Chángyuán	Long Wall	46 Leo		長垣一	Chángyuányī	1st star
Three Enclosures (三垣)	太微垣	Tài Wēi Yuán	Supreme Palace enclosure	長垣	Chángyuán	Long Wall	52 Leo		長垣二	Chángyuánèr	2nd star
Three Enclosures (三垣)	太微垣	Tài Wēi Yuán	Supreme Palace enclosure	長垣	Chángyuán	Long Wall	53 Leo		長垣三	Chángyuánsān	3rd star
Three Enclosures (三垣)	太微垣	Tài Wēi Yuán	Supreme Palace enclosure	長垣	Chángyuán	Long Wall	48 Leo		長垣四	Chángyuánsì	4th star
Three Enclosures (三垣)	太微垣	Tài Wēi Yuán	Supreme Palace enclosure	長垣	Chángyuán	Long Wall	50 Leo		長垣增一	Chángyuánzēngyī	1st additional star
Three Enclosures (三垣)	太微垣	Tài Wēi Yuán	Supreme Palace enclosure	長垣	Chángyuán	Long Wall	49 Leo		長垣增二	Chángyuánzēngèr	2nd additional star
Three Enclosures (三垣)	太微垣	Tài Wēi Yuán	Supreme Palace enclosure	長垣	Chángyuán	Long Wall	37 Sex		長垣增八	Chángyuánzēngbā	8th additional star
Three Enclosures (三垣)	太微垣	Tài Wēi Yuán	Supreme Palace enclosure	長垣	Chángyuán	Long Wall	38 Sex		長垣增九	Chángyuánzēngjiǔ	9th additional star
Vermilion Bird of the South (南方朱雀)	柳	Liǔ	Willow	酒旗	Jiǔqí	Banner of a Wine Shop					
Vermilion Bird of the South (南方朱雀)	柳	Liǔ	Willow	酒旗	Jiǔqí	Banner of a Wine Shop	ψ Leo		酒旗一	Jiǔqíyī	1st star
Vermilion Bird of the South (南方朱雀)	柳	Liǔ	Willow	酒旗	Jiǔqí	Banner of a Wine Shop	ξ Leo		酒旗二	Jiǔqíèr	2nd star
Vermilion Bird of the South (南方朱雀)	柳	Liǔ	Willow	酒旗	Jiǔqí	Banner of a Wine Shop	ω Leo		酒旗三	Jiǔqísān	3rd star
Vermilion Bird of the South (南方朱雀)	柳	Liǔ	Willow	酒旗	Jiǔqí	Banner of a Wine Shop	8 Leo		酒旗增一	Jiǔqízēngyī	1st additional star
Vermilion Bird of the South (南方朱雀)	柳	Liǔ	Willow	酒旗	Jiǔqí	Banner of a Wine Shop	7 Leo		酒旗增二	Jiǔqízēngèr	2nd additional star
Vermilion Bird of the South (南方朱雀)	柳	Liǔ	Willow	酒旗	Jiǔqí	Banner of a Wine Shop	11 Leo		酒旗增三	Jiǔqízēngsān	3rd additional star
Vermilion Bird of the South (南方朱雀)	柳	Liǔ	Willow	酒旗	Jiǔqí	Banner of a Wine Shop	6 Leo		酒旗增四	Jiǔqízēngsì	4th additional star
Vermilion Bird of the South (南方朱雀)	柳	Liǔ	Willow	酒旗	Jiǔqí	Banner of a Wine Shop	3 Leo		酒旗增五	Jiǔqízēngwǔ	5th additional star
Vermilion Bird of the South (南方朱雀)	柳	Xīng	Star	軒轅	Xuānyuán	Xuanyuan					
Vermilion Bird of the South (南方朱雀)	柳	Xīng	Star	軒轅	Xuānyuán	Xuanyuan	DR Leo		軒轅五	Xuānyuánwu	5th star
Vermilion Bird of the South (南方朱雀)	柳	Xīng	Star	軒轅	Xuānyuán	Xuanyuan	15 Leo		軒轅六	Xuānyuánliù	6th star
Vermilion Bird of the South (南方朱雀)	柳	Xīng	Star	軒轅	Xuānyuán	Xuanyuan	κ Leo		軒轅七	Xuānyuánqī	7th star
Vermilion Bird of the South (南方朱雀)	柳	Xīng	Star	軒轅	Xuānyuán	Xuanyuan	λ Leo	Alterf	軒轅八	Xuānyuánbā	8th star
Vermilion Bird of the South (南方朱雀)	柳	Xīng	Star	軒轅	Xuānyuán	Xuanyuan	ε Leo				
Vermilion Bird of the South (南方朱雀)	柳	Xīng	Star	軒轅	Xuānyuán	Xuanyuan	ε Leo		軒轅九	Xuānyuánjiǔ	9th star
Vermilion Bird of the South (南方朱雀)	柳	Xīng	Star	軒轅	Xuānyuán	Xuanyuan	ε Leo		軒轅第九星	Xuanyuandìjiǔxīng	9th star
Vermilion Bird of the South (南方朱雀)	柳	Xīng	Star	軒轅	Xuānyuán	Xuanyuan	μ Leo	Rasalas	軒轅 十|||Xuānyuánshí||10th star		
Vermilion Bird of the South (南方朱雀)	柳	Xīng	Star	軒轅	Xuānyuán	Xuanyuan	ζ Leo	Adhafera	軒轅十一	Xuānyuánshíyī	11th star
Vermilion Bird of the South (南方朱雀)	柳	Xīng	Star	軒轅	Xuānyuán	Xuanyuan	γ^{1} Leo and γ^{2} Leo	Algieba			
Vermilion Bird of the South (南方朱雀)	柳	Xīng	Star	軒轅	Xuānyuán	Xuanyuan	γ^{1} Leo and γ^{2} Leo	Algieba	軒轅十二	Xuānyuánshíèr	12th star
Vermilion Bird of the South (南方朱雀)	柳	Xīng	Star	軒轅	Xuānyuán	Xuanyuan	γ^{1} Leo and γ^{2} Leo	Algieba	軒轅第十二星	Xuānyuándìshíèrxīng	12th star
Vermilion Bird of the South (南方朱雀)	柳	Xīng	Star	軒轅	Xuānyuán	Xuanyuan	γ^{1} Leo and γ^{2} Leo	Algieba	天厕西北星	Tiāncèxīběixīng	Star in the northwest of Toilet constellation
Vermilion Bird of the South (南方朱雀)	柳	Xīng	Star	軒轅	Xuānyuán	Xuanyuan	η Leo				
Vermilion Bird of the South (南方朱雀)	柳	Xīng	Star	軒轅	Xuānyuán	Xuanyuan	η Leo		軒轅十三	Xuānyuánshísān	13th star
Vermilion Bird of the South (南方朱雀)	柳	Xīng	Star	軒轅	Xuānyuán	Xuanyuan	η Leo		軒轅第十三星	Xuānyuándìshísānxīng	13th star
Vermilion Bird of the South (南方朱雀)	柳	Xīng	Star	軒轅	Xuānyuán	Xuanyuan	η Leo		夫人	Fūrén	The people
Vermilion Bird of the South (南方朱雀)	柳	Xīng	Star	軒轅	Xuānyuán	Xuanyuan	α Leo	Regulus			
Vermilion Bird of the South (南方朱雀)	柳	Xīng	Star	軒轅	Xuānyuán	Xuanyuan	α Leo	Regulus	軒轅十四	Xuānyuánshísì	14th star
Vermilion Bird of the South (南方朱雀)	柳	Xīng	Star	軒轅	Xuānyuán	Xuanyuan	α Leo	Regulus	軒轅大星	Xuānyuándàxīng	Big star
Vermilion Bird of the South (南方朱雀)	柳	Xīng	Star	軒轅	Xuānyuán	Xuanyuan	α Leo	Regulus	皇后	Huánghòu	The queen
Vermilion Bird of the South (南方朱雀)	柳	Xīng	Star	軒轅	Xuānyuán	Xuanyuan	α Leo	Regulus	女主	Nǚzhu	The lord woman
Vermilion Bird of the South (南方朱雀)	柳	Xīng	Star	軒轅	Xuānyuán	Xuanyuan	ο Leo	Subra (for component Aa)			
Vermilion Bird of the South (南方朱雀)	柳	Xīng	Star	軒轅	Xuānyuán	Xuanyuan	ο Leo	Subra (for component Aa)	軒轅十五	Xuānyuánshíwǔ	15th star
Vermilion Bird of the South (南方朱雀)	柳	Xīng	Star	軒轅	Xuānyuán	Xuanyuan	ο Leo	Subra (for component Aa)	軒轅右角星	Xuānyuányòujiǎoxīng	Star in the right-side horn
Vermilion Bird of the South (南方朱雀)	柳	Xīng	Star	軒轅	Xuānyuán	Xuanyuan	ο Leo	Subra (for component Aa)	大民	Dàmín	The great man
Vermilion Bird of the South (南方朱雀)	柳	Xīng	Star	軒轅	Xuānyuán	Xuanyuan	ο Leo	Subra (for component Aa)	太民	Tàimín	The big man
Vermilion Bird of the South (南方朱雀)	柳	Xīng	Star	軒轅	Xuānyuán	Xuanyuan	ρ Leo	Shaomin			
Vermilion Bird of the South (南方朱雀)	柳	Xīng	Star	軒轅	Xuānyuán	Xuanyuan	ρ Leo	Shaomin	軒轅十六	Xuānyuánshíliù	16th star
Vermilion Bird of the South (南方朱雀)	柳	Xīng	Star	軒轅	Xuānyuán	Xuanyuan	ρ Leo	Shaomin	軒轅右角星	Xuānyuányòujiǎoxīng	Star in the right top
Vermilion Bird of the South (南方朱雀)	柳	Xīng	Star	軒轅	Xuānyuán	Xuanyuan	ρ Leo	Shaomin	少民	Shǎomín	The less-rank man
Vermilion Bird of the South (南方朱雀)	柳	Xīng	Star	軒轅	Xuānyuán	Xuanyuan	31 Leo	Yunü			
Vermilion Bird of the South (南方朱雀)	柳	Xīng	Star	軒轅	Xuānyuán	Xuanyuan	31 Leo	Yunü	軒轅十七	Xuānyuánshíqī	17th star
Vermilion Bird of the South (南方朱雀)	柳	Xīng	Star	軒轅	Xuānyuán	Xuanyuan	31 Leo	Yunü	参宿中心西第一星	Shēnsùzhōngxīnxīdìyīxīng	Star in the heart and in the west of Three Stars constellation
Vermilion Bird of the South (南方朱雀)	柳	Xīng	Star	軒轅	Xuānyuán	Xuanyuan	HD 80956		軒轅增二十五	Xuānyuánzēngèrshíwǔ	25th additional star
Vermilion Bird of the South (南方朱雀)	柳	Xīng	Star	軒轅	Xuānyuán	Xuanyuan	9 Leo		軒轅增二十六	Xuānyuánzēngèrshíliù	26th additional star
Vermilion Bird of the South (南方朱雀)	柳	Xīng	Star	軒轅	Xuānyuán	Xuanyuan	13 Leo		軒轅增二十七	Xuānyuánzēngèrshíqī	27th additional star
Vermilion Bird of the South (南方朱雀)	柳	Xīng	Star	軒轅	Xuānyuán	Xuanyuan	22 Leo		軒轅增二十八	Xuānyuánzēngèrshíbā	28th additional star
Vermilion Bird of the South (南方朱雀)	柳	Xīng	Star	軒轅	Xuānyuán	Xuanyuan	20 Leo		軒轅增二十九	Xuānyuánzēngèrshíjiǔ	29th additional star
Vermilion Bird of the South (南方朱雀)	柳	Xīng	Star	軒轅	Xuānyuán	Xuanyuan	35 Leo		軒轅增三十	Xuānyuánzēngsānshí	30th additional star
Vermilion Bird of the South (南方朱雀)	柳	Xīng	Star	軒轅	Xuānyuán	Xuanyuan	39 Leo		軒轅增三十一	Xuānyuánzēngsānshíyī	31st additional star
Vermilion Bird of the South (南方朱雀)	柳	Xīng	Star	軒轅	Xuānyuán	Xuanyuan	40 Leo		軒轅增三十二	Xuānyuánzēngsānshíèr	32nd additional star
Vermilion Bird of the South (南方朱雀)	柳	Xīng	Star	軒轅	Xuānyuán	Xuanyuan	33 Leo		軒轅增三十四	Xuānyuánzēngsānshísì	34th additional star
Vermilion Bird of the South (南方朱雀)	柳	Xīng	Star	軒轅	Xuānyuán	Xuanyuan	42 Leo		軒轅增三十五	Xuānyuánzēngsānshíwǔ	35th additional star
Vermilion Bird of the South (南方朱雀)	柳	Xīng	Star	軒轅	Xuānyuán	Xuanyuan	37 Leo		軒轅增三十六	Xuānyuánzēngsānshíliù	36th additional star
Vermilion Bird of the South (南方朱雀)	柳	Xīng	Star	軒轅	Xuānyuán	Xuanyuan	34 Leo		軒轅增三十七	Xuānyuánzēngsānshíqī	37th additional star
Vermilion Bird of the South (南方朱雀)	柳	Xīng	Star	軒轅	Xuānyuán	Xuanyuan	π Leo		軒轅增三十八	Xuānyuánzēngsānshíbā	38th additional star
Vermilion Bird of the South (南方朱雀)	柳	Xīng	Star	軒轅	Xuānyuán	Xuanyuan	HD 86369		軒轅增三十八	Xuānyuánzēngsānshíjiǔ	39th additional star
Vermilion Bird of the South (南方朱雀)	柳	Xīng	Star	軒轅	Xuānyuán	Xuanyuan	ν Leo		軒轅增四十二	Xuānyuánzēngsìshíèr	42nd additional star
Vermilion Bird of the South (南方朱雀)	柳	Xīng	Star	軒轅	Xuānyuán	Xuanyuan	23 Leo		軒轅增四十三	Xuānyuánzēngsìshísān	43rd additional star
Vermilion Bird of the South (南方朱雀)	柳	Xīng	Star	軒轅	Xuānyuán	Xuanyuan	18 Leo		軒轅增四十四	Xuānyuánzēngsìshísì	44th additional star
Vermilion Bird of the South (南方朱雀)	柳	Xīng	Star	軒轅	Xuānyuán	Xuanyuan	10 Leo		軒轅增四十五	Xuānyuánzēngsìshíwǔ	45th additional star
Vermilion Bird of the South (南方朱雀)	柳	Xīng	Star	軒轅	Xuānyuán	Xuanyuan	43 Leo		軒轅增五十五	Xuānyuánzēngwǔshíwǔ	55th additional star
Vermilion Bird of the South (南方朱雀)	柳	Xīng	Star	軒轅	Xuānyuán	Xuanyuan	44 Leo		軒轅增五十六	Xuānyuánzēngwǔshíliù	56th additional star
Vermilion Bird of the South (南方朱雀)	柳	Xīng	Star	軒轅	Xuānyuán	Xuanyuan	45 Leo		軒轅增五十七	Xuānyuánzēngwǔshíqī	57th additional star
Vermilion Bird of the South (南方朱雀)	柳	Xīng	Star	御女	Yùnǚ	Maids-In-Waiting	31 Leo	Yunü	御女	Yùnǚ	(One star of)

== See also ==
- Traditional Chinese star names
- Chinese constellations
