= Gamma1 Leonis b =

Exoplanet or brown dwarf

Gamma^{1} Leonis b
Discovery
- Discovered by: Inwoo Han et al.
- Discovery site: South Korea
- Discovery date: November 6, 2009
- Detection method: Radial velocity

Orbital characteristics
- Apastron: 1.36 AU (203,000,000 km)
- Periastron: 1.02 AU (153,000,000 km)
- Semi-major axis: 1.19 AU (178,000,000 km)
- Eccentricity: 0.14
- Orbital period (sidereal): 429 d 1.17 y
- Average orbital speed: 30.3
- Star: Gamma^{1} Leonis (Algieba A)

Physical characteristics
- Mass: >10.7 M_{J}

Gamma^{1} Leonis b is an extrasolar planet located 125.5 light years away in the constellation Leo, orbiting the giant star Gamma^{1} Leonis.

== Discovery ==
On November 6, 2009, a planetary companion around primary star Gamma^{1} Leonis has been announced. Moreover, radial velocity variations would also hint two strong signals at 8.5 and 1340 days. The former periodicity is likely due to stellar pulsation, whereas the latter could be indicative of the presence of an additional planetary companion with 2.14 Jupiter masses, moderate eccentricity (e=0.13) and located at 2.6 Astronomical Units away from the giant star. Nevertheless, the nature of such a signal is still unclear and further investigations are needed to confirm or rule out an additional substellar companion.

== Characteristics ==
The planet has a minimum mass of 10.7 Jupiter masses. The true mass, as with the majority of other extrasolar planets discovered by the radial velocity method, is unknown. Depending on the planet's inclination relative to Earth, it may be sufficiently massive to be classified as a brown dwarf.

== Host star ==
Gamma Leonis A is the main star of a binary star system in the constellation Leo (the lion). It is a K-type red giant of apparent magnitude 2.37, with around 26 times the size of the Sun and 250 times its luminosity. The secondary component is a fainter G-type giant of apparent magnitude 3.64, eleven times bigger than the Sun with 63 times its luminosity. Together, they shine with apparent magnitude 2.04, making it the second-brightest star in Leo after Regulus. This system shares the traditional name Algieba.

The Algieba system can be easily split by a telescope. Due to the large orbital separation between the stars, only a small fraction of the orbit has been observed since discovery, and the orbital parameters are still poorly known.
