= 31 Leonis =

Binary star system in the constellation Leo

- Location of 31 Leonis (circled in red)

Observation data Epoch J2000.0 Equinox J2000.0
- Constellation: Leo
- Right ascension: 10^{h} 07^{m} 54.2701^{s}
- Declination: +09° 59′ 51.025″
- Apparent magnitude (V): 4.39

Characteristics
- Spectral type: K3.5 IIIb Fe-1:
- B−V color index: 1.447

Astrometry
Radial velocity (R_{v})	+39.84±0.20 km/s
Proper motion (μ)	RA: −82.021 mas/yr Dec.: −64.844 mas/yr
Parallax (π)	11.0209±0.1661 mas
Distance	296 ± 4 ly (91 ± 1 pc)
Absolute magnitude (M_{V})	−0.39

Details
Radius	33.9+0.7 −0.71 R_{☉}
Luminosity	283±9 L_{☉}
Surface gravity (log g)	1.42 cgs
Temperature	4066±28 K
Metallicity [Fe/H]	−0.02 dex
Rotational velocity (v sin i)	5.1 km/s

Other designations
- Yunü, 31 Leo, BD+10°2112, HD 87837, HIP 49637, HR 3980, SAO 98964

Database references
SIMBAD	data

31 Leonis, also named Yunü, is a binary star system in the equatorial constellation of Leo. The system is visible to the naked eye in unresolved form, having a combined apparent visual magnitude of 4.39. An estimated distance of around 300 light years is obtained from the annual parallax shift of 11.02 mas as seen from Earth's orbit. At the current distance, interstellar extinction between Earth and 31 Leo diminished the apparent brightness by 0.12 magnitudes. It is moving away from the Sun with a radial velocity of +39.8 km/s.

The primary member of 31 Leonis, component A, is an evolved K-type red giant with a stellar classification of K3.5 IIIb Fe-1:, where the suffix notation indicates an underabundance of iron in the spectrum. It has expanded to 34 times the Solar radius and is radiating around 283 times the Sun's luminosity from its photosphere at an effective temperature of 4,066 K. The magnitude 13.6 secondary, component B, lies at an angular separation of 7.9 arcseconds, as of 2008.

This star has the traditional Chinese name Yunü (御女); it is in the middle of the southernmost stars of the Xuanyuan (轩辕) constellation (ο Leonis and ρ Leonis). The IAU Working Group on Star Names approved the name Yunü for 31 Leonis A on 18 July 2024 and it is now so entered in the IAU Catalog of Star Names.
