= Psi Leonis =

Star in the constellation Leo

ψ Leonis
- Location of ψ Leonis (circled in red)

Observation data Epoch J2000.0 Equinox ICRS
- Constellation: Leo
- Right ascension: 09^{h} 43^{m} 43.90682^{s}
- Declination: +14° 01′ 18.1311″
- Apparent magnitude (V): 5.38

Characteristics
- Evolutionary stage: AGB
- Spectral type: M2 IIIab
- U−B color index: +1.95
- B−V color index: +1.60

Astrometry
Radial velocity (R_{v})	10.98±0.18 km/s
Proper motion (μ)	RA: +1.614 mas/yr Dec.: −2.014 mas/yr
Parallax (π)	5.3048±0.0890 mas
Distance	610 ± 10 ly (189 ± 3 pc)
Absolute magnitude (M_{V})	−1.39

Details
Mass	1.3 M_{☉}
Radius	62 R_{☉}
Luminosity	903 L_{☉}
Surface gravity (log g)	1.97 cgs
Temperature	3,857 K
Metallicity [Fe/H]	−0.29 dex

Other designations
- ψ Leo, 16 Leo, BD+14°2136, FK5 1252, HD 84194, HIP 47723, HR 3866, SAO 98733

Database references
SIMBAD	data

ψ Leonis (Latinised as Psi Leonis, abbreviated to ψ Leo or Psi Leo), is a solitary star located in the zodiac constellation of Leo, to the east-northeast of Regulus. It is faintly visible to the naked eye with an apparent visual magnitude of 5.38. Based upon stellar parallax measurements, it is located around 610 light years from the Sun. At that distance, the visual magnitude of the star is diminished by an absorption factor of 0.3 due to interstellar dust.

Psi Leonis is an evolved red giant star with a stellar classification of M2 IIIab. It shines with a luminosity over 900 times that of the Sun from a relatively cool outer atmosphere that has an effective temperature of 3,756 K. It is a suspected variable star with a measured brightness variation of 0^{m}.018. Psi Leonis has a magnitude 11.63 visual companion at an angular separation of 281.60 arcseconds along a position angle of 139°, as of 2000.
