= 56 Leonis =

Variable star in the constellation Leo

- Location of 56 Leonis (circled)

Observation data Epoch J2000.0 Equinox ICRS
- Constellation: Leo
- Right ascension: 10^{h} 56^{m} 01.4690^{s}
- Declination: +06° 11′ 07.328″
- Apparent magnitude (V): 5.69 – 6.03

Characteristics
- Evolutionary stage: AGB
- Spectral type: M5.5III
- Variable type: LB?

Astrometry
Proper motion (μ)	RA: −23.90 mas/yr Dec.: −6.42 mas/yr
Parallax (π)	8.39±0.37 mas
Distance	390 ± 20 ly (119 ± 5 pc)

Details
Mass	1.1 M_{☉}
Radius	192 R_{☉}
Luminosity	1,479 L_{☉}
Surface gravity (log g)	0.64 cgs
Temperature	3,279 K
Metallicity [Fe/H]	+0.45 dex

Other designations
- 56 Leo, VY Leo, BD+06°2469, HD 94705, HIP 53449, HR 4267

Database references
SIMBAD	data

56 Leonis is a red giant variable star located approximately 390 light years away in the constellation Leo.

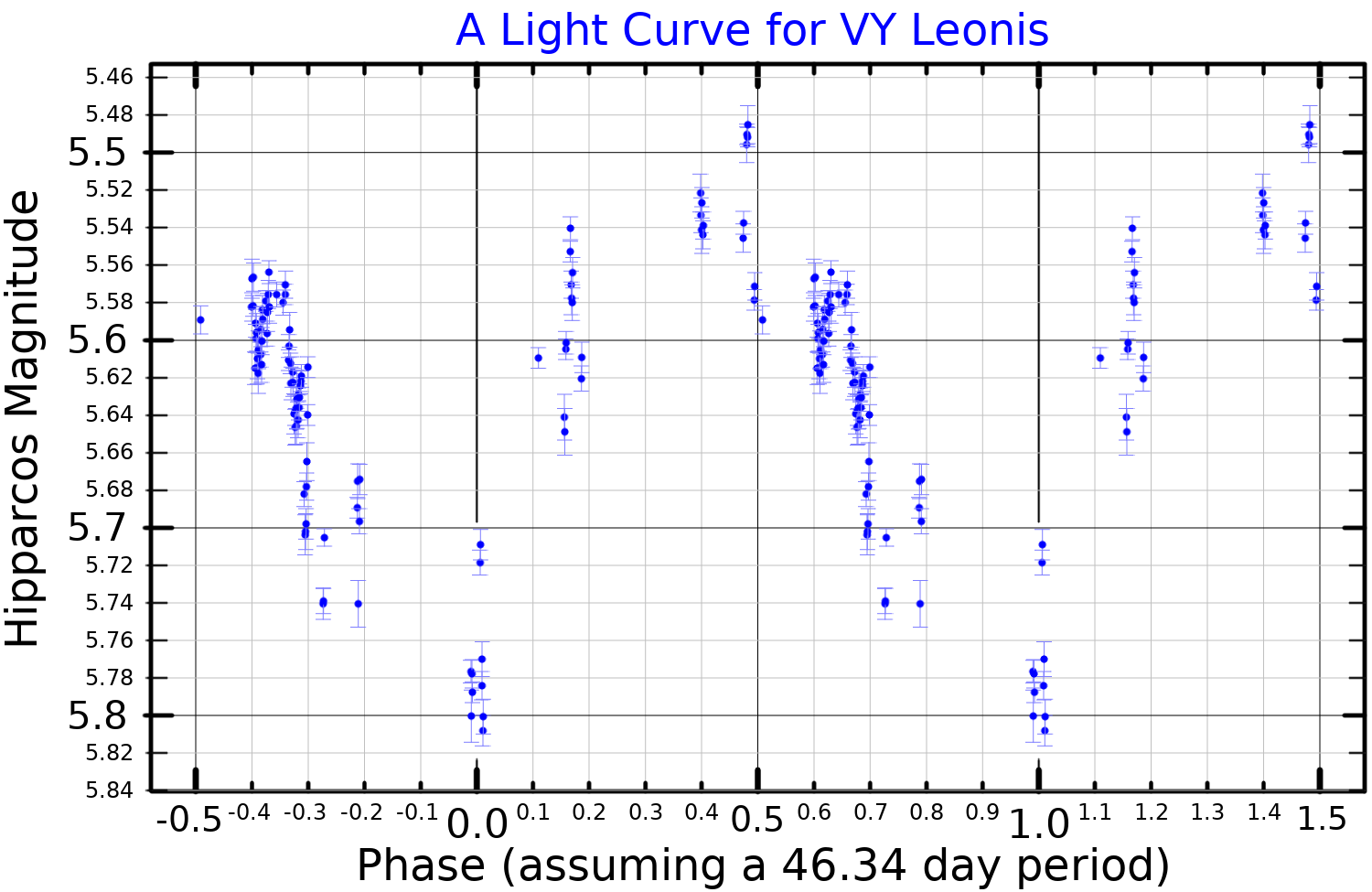
A light curve for VY Leonis, plotted from Hipparcos data

The apparent magnitude of 56 Leonis varies between 5.69 and 6.03, making it dimly visible to the naked eye, and it has been given the variable star designation VY Leo. The type of variability is uncertain. The General Catalogue of Variable Stars suggests it may be a slow irregular variable, but some sources have found periods and report it as semiregular.

The spectral class of 56 Leonis is M5.5III, indicating a cool red giant star that has exhausted the supply of hydrogen at its core and evolved away from the main sequence. It is undecided whether it is currently on the red giant branch or asymptotic giant branch. The star has an estimated 1.1 times the mass of the Sun but has expanded to 192 times the Sun's radius. The star is radiating 1,479 times the Sun's luminosity from its enlarged photosphere at an effective temperature of 3,279 K.
