= 88 Leonis =

Star in the constellation Leo

Observation data Epoch ICRS Equinox ICRS
- Constellation: Leo
- A
- Right ascension: 11^{h} 31^{m} 44.94416^{s}
- Declination: +14° 21′ 52.2107″
- Apparent magnitude (V): 6.27
- B
- Right ascension: 11^{h} 31^{m} 44.41783^{s}
- Declination: +14° 22′ 05.6745″
- Apparent magnitude (V): 9.22

Characteristics

A
- Evolutionary stage: main sequence
- Spectral type: F9.5V
- U−B color index: +0.07
- B−V color index: +0.57

B
- Evolutionary stage: main sequence
- Spectral type: G5
- U−B color index: +1.03
- B−V color index: +1.14

Astrometry

A
Radial velocity (R_{v})	−4.78±0.13 km/s
Proper motion (μ)	RA: −3329.873 mas/yr Dec.: −189.925 mas/yr
Parallax (π)	42.6536±0.0726 mas
Distance	76.5 ± 0.1 ly (23.44 ± 0.04 pc)
Absolute magnitude (M_{V})	+4.30

B
Radial velocity (R_{v})	−4.59±0.17 km/s
Proper motion (μ)	RA: −315.623 mas/yr Dec.: −181.122 mas/yr
Parallax (π)	42.3382±0.0223 mas
Distance	77.04 ± 0.04 ly (23.62 ± 0.01 pc)
Absolute magnitude (M_{V})	+7.31

Details

88 Leo A
Mass	1.06 M_{☉}
Radius	1.12 R_{☉}
Luminosity	1.40 L_{☉}
Surface gravity (log g)	4.25 cgs
Temperature	5,990 K
Metallicity [Fe/H]	+0.03 dex
Rotation	14.32 days
Rotational velocity (v sin i)	1.7 km/s
Age	4.12 Gyr

88 Leo B
Mass	0.69 M_{☉}
Radius	0.72 R_{☉}
Luminosity	0.18 L_{☉}
Surface gravity (log g)	4.57 cgs
Temperature	4,423 K

Other designations
- STF 1547 AB, 88 Leonis, BD+15°2345, HD 100180, HIP 56242, HR 4437, WDS J11317+1422, Wolf 401
- 88 Leo A: AG+14°1209, GJ 3669, SAO 99648, LTT 13145
- 88 Leo B: AG+14°1208, GJ 3670, SAO 99647, LTT 13146

Database references
SIMBAD	data
- B

88 Leonis is a wide binary star system in the equatorial constellation of Leo, the lion. The system is near the lower limit of visibility to the naked eye with a combined apparent visual magnitude of 6.2. It is located at a distance of 77 light years from the Sun based on parallax, but is drifting closer with a radial velocity of about −4.6 km/s. It has a relatively high proper motion, traversing the celestial sphere at the rate of 0.379 arc seconds per annum.

The primary member of the system, component A, is a yellow-white hued F-type main-sequence star with a stellar classification of F9.5V. It is an estimated 4.1 billion years old and is spinning with a rotation period of 14.3 days. The star has a short magnetic activity cycle that averages around 3.5 years. A second cycle appears to vary over time, lasting 13.7 years at the start of observations then decreasing to 8.6 years over a span of 34 years of measurement. The star has 1.1 times the mass of the Sun and 1.1 times the Sun's radius. It is radiating 1.5 times the luminosity of the Sun from its photosphere at an effective temperature of 5,990 K.

The secondary, component B, is a magnitude 9.22 star at an angular separation of 15.46″ from the primary along a position angle of 326°. It has a class of G5 and 69% of the Sun's mass. The pair share a common proper motion through space with a projected separation of 360.6 AU.
