= Gamma Leonis =

Binary star in the constellation Leo

- Location of γ Leonis (circled)

Observation data Epoch J2000 Equinox ICRS
- Constellation: Leo
- Right ascension: 10^{h} 19^{m} 58.35056^{s}
- Declination: +19° 50′ 29.3468″
- Apparent magnitude (V): 2.08 (2.37/3.64)

Characteristics
- Evolutionary stage: Red clump
- Spectral type: K0III + G7III
- U−B color index: +1.00
- B−V color index: +1.15
- Variable type: Unknown-type variable (B)

Astrometry
Radial velocity (R_{v})	−36.24±0.18 km/s
Proper motion (μ)	RA: +304.30 mas/yr Dec.: −154.28 mas/yr
Parallax (π)	25.07±0.52 mas
Distance	130 ± 3 ly (39.9 ± 0.8 pc)
Absolute magnitude (M_{V})	−0.27/+0.98

Orbit (Note: The orbital parameters are still subject to uncertainites and should be viewed with caution.)
Period (P)	553+82 −72 yr
Semi-major axis (a)	3.09+0.31 −0.29″
Eccentricity (e)	0.901+0.023 −0.021
Inclination (i)	49.2+7.1 −8.2°
Longitude of the node (Ω)	346.7+9.9 −9.3°
Periastron epoch (T)	1751+44 −50

Details

γ Leo A
Mass	1.66±0.14 M_{☉}
Radius	26.08±0.79 – 31.88±1.61 R_{☉}
Luminosity	250 L_{☉}
Surface gravity (log g)	1.8±0.04 cgs
Temperature	4,457±63 K
Metallicity [Fe/H]	−0.41±0.03 dex
Rotational velocity (v sin i)	1.41 km/s
Age	1.75±0.43 Gyr

γ Leo B
Mass	1.55±0.08 M_{☉}
Radius	10.55±0.29 R_{☉}
Luminosity	63.1 L_{☉}
Surface gravity (log g)	2.56±0.04 cgs
Temperature	4,969±15 K
Metallicity [Fe/H]	–0.38 ± 0.02 dex
Rotational velocity (v sin i)	1.62 km/s
Age	2.12±0.33 Gyr

Other designations
- Algieba, γ Leonis, 41 Leo, NSV 4823, BD+20°2467, HIP 50583, WDS 10200+1950, LTT 12764/12765
- γ Leo A: γ^{1} Leonis, HD 89484, HR 4057, SAO 81298
- γ Leo B: γ^{2} Leonis, HD 89485, HR 4058, SAO 81299

Position (relative to A)
Component	B
Epoch of observation	1820 – 2022
Angular distance	3.7" (1820), 4.7" (2022)″

Database references
SIMBAD	data
Exoplanet Archive	data

Gamma Leonis, also named Algieba /ælˈdʒiːbə/, is a binary star system in the constellation of Leo, made up of two red giants. The primary star is orbited by one known exoplanet.

== Nomenclature ==
γ Leonis (Latinised to Gamma Leonis, abbreviated Gamma Leo, γ Leo) is the star's Bayer designation. The A and B components of the binary are often referred to as γ^{1} Leonis and γ^{2} Leonis, respectively.

It also bore the traditional name Algieba or Al Gieba, which originated from the Arabic الجبهة Al-Jabhah, meaning 'the forehead' (despite this meaning, the star actually appears in the mane of Leo). In 2016, the International Astronomical Union organized a Working Group on Star Names (WGSN) to catalog and standardize proper names for stars. The WGSN's first bulletin of July 2016 included a table of the first two batches of names approved by the WGSN, which included Algieba for this star.

The star's traditional Latin name was Juba. It is known as 軒轅十二 (the Twelfth Star of Xuanyuan) in Chinese (Xuanyuan is a constellation representing the Yellow Emperor).

Algieba, along with Zeta Leonis, Regulus, Mu Leonis, Epsilon Leonis and Eta Leonis, have collectively been called the Sickle, which is an asterism that marks the head of Leo.

== Stellar system ==
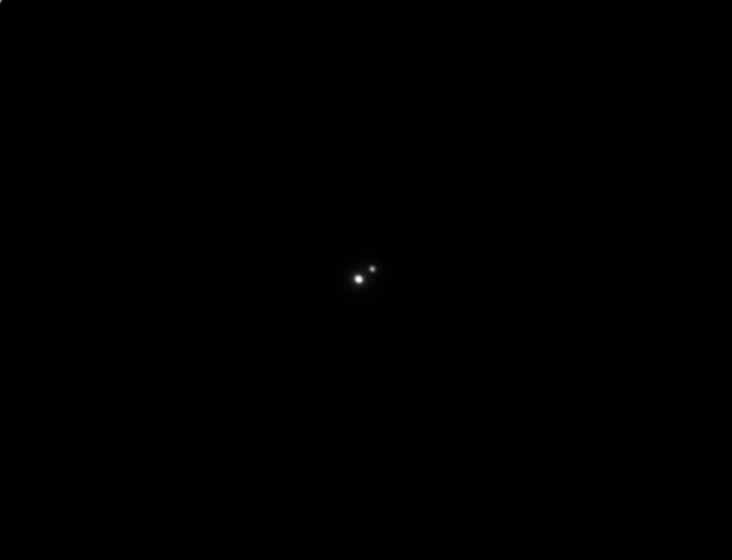
Double star γ Leonis as seen by a telescope

The bright binary system in Leo with orange-red and yellow or greenish-yellow components is visible through a modest telescope under good atmospheric conditions. To the naked eye, the Algieba system shines at mid-second magnitude, but a telescope easily splits the pair. The double nature of Gamma Leonis was discovered by William Herschel in 1792.

The brighter component (named Gamma^{1} Leonis) has an apparent magnitude of +2.28 and is of spectral class K0III. This giant K star has a surface temperature of 4,460 K, 250 times the luminosity of the Sun, and 26 to 32 times the Sun's diameter. The companion (named Gamma^{2} Leonis) has an apparent magnitude of +3.51 and belongs to the spectral class G7III. This giant G star has a temperature of 4,970 K, is 63 times more luminous and 10 times larger than the Sun. Both are more likely red clump giants, evolved stars that have undergone a helium flash and are now fusing helium at their core. They are estimated to be 2 billion years old and have subsolar metallicites.

The orbital parameters of Gamma Leonis are still uncertain due to the very long orbital period; only a fraction of the orbit has been tracked. The orbital period is thought to be between 400 and 700 years, and the orbit is highly eccentric. A preliminary estimate suggest an orbital period of 554 years and an angular semi-major axis of 3.1", while another suggest a period of 510 years and angular semi-major axis of 4.24". However, such estimates are doubtful, by the Kepler's third law, they would imply that the stars' sum of masses are 6.3 M_{☉} and 18.6 M_{☉} respectively, which is at odds with the sum of mass (3.21 M_{☉}) estimated from other methods. The orbital solution was revised in 2025 with data spanning 190 years, yielding an orbital period of 553 years and a semi-major axis of 3.1", although the implied sum of masses (5.5 M_{☉}) is still inconsistent with the values inferred from stellar evolution models.

== Variability ==
The secondary component, γ Leonis B, has been found to be a variable star by data taken during the Hipparcos mission. The combined magnitude of the pair varies from 2.16 to 2.21 at Hipparcos wavelengths, over a period of either 1.65289 or 1.6245 days. The variable type is unknown. In 1959, the star was mistakenly published as an eclipsing binary due to a typographical error when referring to Y Leonis.

The flare star AD Leonis lies just 5' from γ Leonis. It is unrelated to the pair, and much closer to Earth at a distance of 4.97 parsecs (16.2 ly).

== Planetary system ==
On November 6, 2009, a planetary companion around primary star was announced. The discovery was made using Doppler spectroscopy, also known as the radial velocity method. The planet is a gas giant several times more massive than Jupiter, with an orbital period of 429 days and a semi-major axis of 1.2 AU, or 20% larger than that of Earth around the Sun.

A more recent analysis revised the minimum mass of Gamma^{1} Leonis b to about 10.7 M_{J}, an increase of by 20% in contrast to the older estimate of 8.78 M_{J}). This is based on a larger mass for the host star, 1.66 M_{☉} instead of the previous 1.23 M_{☉}. If the planet's inclination relative to Earth is significantly different from an edge-on inclination (90°), it may be sufficiently massive to be a brown dwarf rather than a planet.

The radial velocity measurements suggest two additional periodicities of 8.5 and 1,340 days. The former is likely due to stellar pulsation, whereas the latter could be indicative of the presence of an additional planetary companion with 2.14 Jupiter masses, moderate eccentricity (e=0.13) and located at 2.6 AU away from the giant star. Nevertheless, the nature of such a signal is still unclear and further investigations are needed to confirm or rule out an additional substellar companion.

The γ^{1} Leonis planetary system
Companion (in order from star)	Mass	Semimajor axis (AU)	Orbital period (days)	Eccentricity	Inclination (°)	Radius
b	≥10.7 M_{J}	1.19	429	0.14	—	—
c (unconfirmed)	≥2.14 M_{J}	2.6	1,340	0.13	—	—
