= Kappa Leonis =

Star in the constellation Leo

κ Leonis
- Location of κ Leonis (circled in red)

Observation data Epoch J2000 Equinox ICRS
- Constellation: Leo
- Right ascension: 09^{h} 24^{m} 39.25874^{s}
- Declination: +26° 10′ 56.3650″
- Apparent magnitude (V): 4.460

Characteristics
- Spectral type: K2 III
- U−B color index: +1.31
- B−V color index: +1.23

Astrometry
Radial velocity (R_{v})	+27.94 km/s
Proper motion (μ)	RA: –31.64 mas/yr Dec.: –48.20 mas/yr
Parallax (π)	16.20±0.21 mas
Distance	201 ± 3 ly (61.7 ± 0.8 pc)
Absolute magnitude (M_{V})	0.66±0.028

Details
Mass	1.44 M_{☉}
Radius	17 R_{☉}
Luminosity	89 L_{☉}
Surface gravity (log g)	2.34 cgs
Temperature	4,403±24 K
Metallicity [Fe/H]	+0.01 dex
Rotational velocity (v sin i)	10 km/s
Age	4.33 Gyr

Other designations
- Al Min'ħar al A'sad, κ Leo, 1 Leo, BD+26°1939, FK5 1244, HD 81146, HIP 46146, HR 3731, SAO 80807

Database references
SIMBAD	data

Kappa Leonis, Latinized from κ Leonis, is a double star in the constellation Leo. It was called Al-minħar al-asad (Arabic: المنخر الأسد), meaning "the Lion's nose." The name is corrupted to Al Minliar al Asad in the Yale Bright Star Catalogue. This star is visible to the naked eye with an apparent visual magnitude of 4.46. It has an annual parallax shift of 16.20 mas as seen from Earth, which provides a distance estimate of about 201 light years. Kappa Leonis is moving away from the Sun with a radial velocity of +28 km/s.

The primary component is an evolved K-type giant star with a stellar classification of K2 III. It is about the same age as the Sun with an estimated 144% of the Sun's mass and has expanded to 17 times the Sun's girth. It is radiating 89 times the luminosity of the Sun from its enlarged photosphere at an effective temperature of 4,400 K.

Kappa Leonis has a magnitude 10.4 companion at an angular separation of 2.1 arc seconds. The pair most likely form a binary star system. The companion is a suspected variable star.
