= 72 Leonis =

Single, variable M-type giant star in the constellation Leo

- Location of 72 Leonis (circled)

Observation data Epoch J2000 Equinox ICRS
- Constellation: Leo
- Right ascension: 11^{h} 15^{m} 12.22839^{s}
- Declination: +23° 05′ 43.8322″
- Apparent magnitude (V): 4.63

Characteristics
- Evolutionary stage: AGB
- Spectral type: M3 IIb
- B−V color index: 1.657±0.003
- Variable type: LC

Astrometry
Radial velocity (R_{v})	14.76±0.21 km/s
Proper motion (μ)	RA: −25.612 mas/yr Dec.: −5.995 mas/yr
Parallax (π)	4.2936±0.2815 mas
Distance	760 ± 50 ly (230 ± 20 pc)
Absolute magnitude (M_{V})	−2.69

Details
Mass	3.11 M_{☉}
Radius	149+9 −10 R_{☉}
Luminosity	5,770 L_{☉}
Surface gravity (log g)	1.16 cgs
Temperature	3,613±48 K
Metallicity [Fe/H]	−0.03 dex
Age	400 Myr

Other designations
- 72 Leo, FN Leo, AAVSO 1109+23, BD+23°2322, FK5 2897, HD 97778, HIP 54951, HR 4362, SAO 81736

Database references
SIMBAD	data

72 Leonis is a single variable star in the zodiac constellation of Leo, located roughly 760 light years away. It has the variable star designation FN Leonis; 72 Leonis is the Flamsteed designation. In Chinese astronomy, 72 Leonis is called 虎賁, Pinyin: Hǔbēn, meaning Emperor’s Bodyguard, because this star is marking itself and stands alone in the Emperor’s Bodyguard asterism, Supreme Palace enclosure mansion (see : Chinese constellation).

This object is visible to the naked eye as a red-hued star with an apparent visual magnitude of 4.56. It is an evolved bright giant with a stellar classification of M3 IIb and was listed as a spectral standard star for that class. The star is classified as an irregular variable of type LC, ranging from Hipparcos magnitude 4.56 down to 4.64. It has a radius 150 times that of the Sun and radiates 5,770 times the Sun's luminosity at an effective temperature of around 3,613 K. The star is moving away from the Earth with a heliocentric radial velocity of 15 km/s.

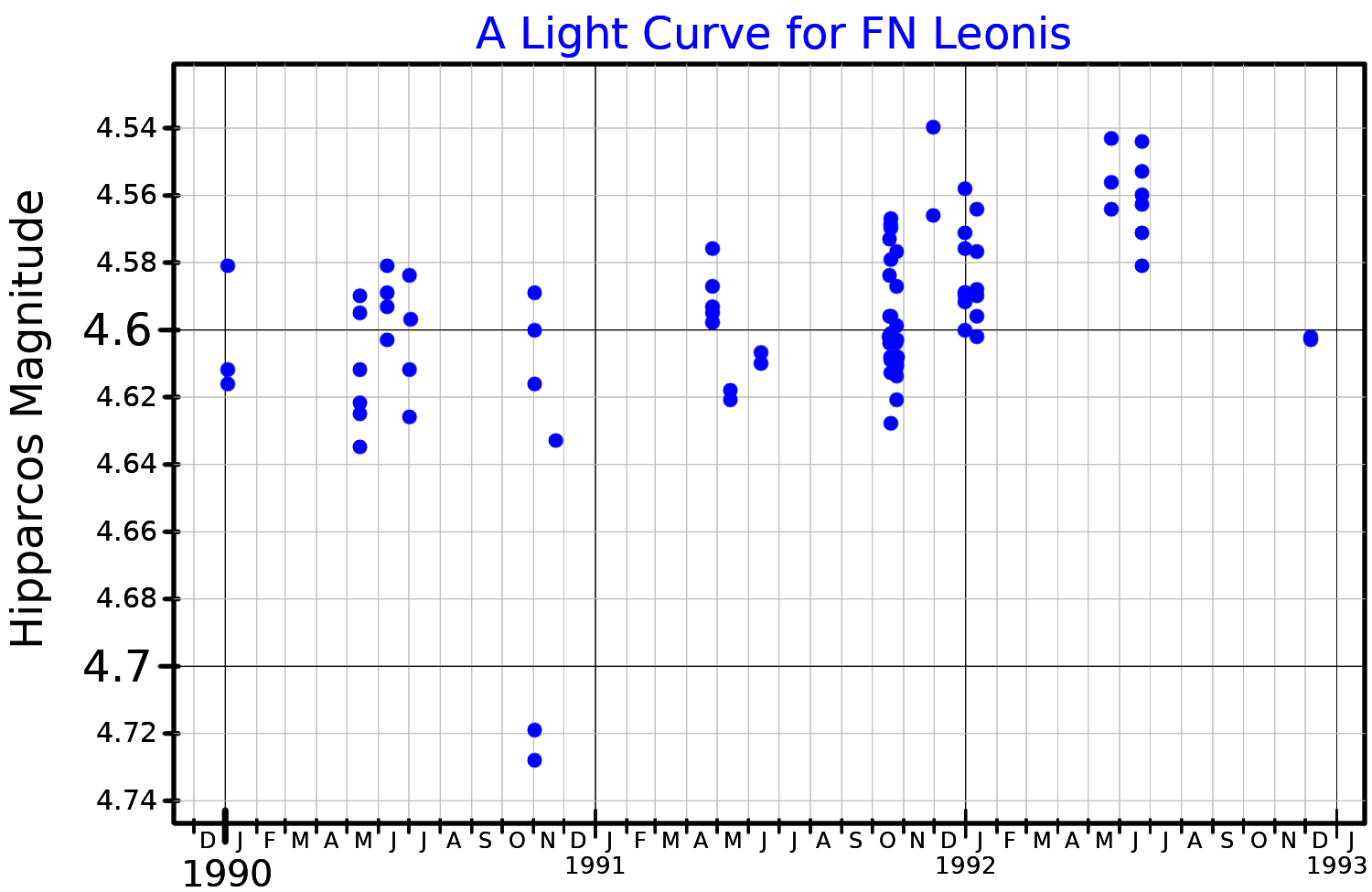
A light curve for FN Leonis, plotted from Hipparcos data
