= Tau Leonis =

Star in the constellation Leo

τ Leonis
- Location of τ Leonis (circled in red)

Observation data Epoch J2000.0 Equinox ICRS
- Constellation: Leo
- Right ascension: 11^{h} 27^{m} 56.23976^{s}
- Declination: +02° 51′ 22.5609″
- Apparent magnitude (V): 5.00

Characteristics
- Spectral type: G8- IIIa
- U−B color index: +0.80
- B−V color index: +1.005

Astrometry
Radial velocity (R_{v})	−8.90 km/s
Proper motion (μ)	RA: +16.89 mas/yr Dec.: −9.81 mas/yr
Parallax (π)	5.80±0.33 mas
Distance	560 ± 30 ly (172 ± 10 pc)
Absolute magnitude (M_{V})	−1.12±0.124

Details
Mass	3.90±0.19 M_{☉}
Radius	25.14±1.55 R_{☉}
Luminosity	329.6±39.6 L_{☉}
Surface gravity (log g)	2.25±0.05 cgs
Temperature	4,910±33 K
Metallicity [Fe/H]	−0.07±0.10 dex
Age	190±20 Myr

Other designations
- τ Leo, 84 Leo, BD+03°2504, FK5 1297, HD 99648, HIP 55945, HR 4418, SAO 118875

Database references
SIMBAD	data

Tau Leonis (τ Leo) is a star in the zodiac constellation of Leo. Because it is located near the ecliptic, it is subject to occultations by the Moon. It has an apparent visual magnitude of 5.00, which is bright enough to be seen with the naked eye. The distance to this star, as estimated using parallax measurements, is 560 light years. It is moving closer to the Sun with a radial velocity of −9 km/s.

This G-type giant star has a stellar classification of G8- IIIa and currently resides on the red giant branch. It has about 390% of the Sun's mass. The star is much younger than the Sun, with an age of around 190 million years. As an evolved giant, it has expanded to about 25 times the Sun's radius and radiates 330 times the luminosity of the Sun. The effective temperature of the outer atmosphere is 4,910 K.
