= 73 Leonis =

Binary star in the constellation Leo

- Location of 73 Leonis (circled in red)

Observation data Epoch J2000 Equinox ICRS
- Constellation: Leo
- Right ascension: 11^{h} 15^{m} 51.8801^{s}
- Declination: +13° 18′ 27.235″
- Apparent magnitude (V): +5.32

Characteristics
- Spectral type: K2 III + F6V
- B−V color index: +1.19

Astrometry
Radial velocity (R_{v})	+14.51±0.01 km/s
Proper motion (μ)	RA: +7.895 mas/yr Dec.: −10.518 mas/yr
Parallax (π)	7.0432±0.1980 mas
Distance	460 ± 10 ly (142 ± 4 pc)
Absolute magnitude (M_{V})	−0.58

Orbit
Period (P)	8.10420±0.00059 yr
Semi-major axis (a)	45.470±0.058 mas (6.535 AU)
Eccentricity (e)	0.42510±0.00096
Inclination (i)	58.03±0.16°
Longitude of the node (Ω)	283.410±0.076°
Periastron epoch (T)	2006.2870±0.0011
Argument of periastron (ω) (secondary)	332.7±4.9°
Semi-amplitude (K_{1}) (primary)	9.400±0.013 km/s

Details

73 Leo A
Mass	1.55 M_{☉}
Radius	25.5±3.9 R_{☉}
Luminosity	195±58 L_{☉}
Surface gravity (log g)	2.02 cgs
Temperature	4,271±85 K
Metallicity [Fe/H]	−0.10 dex
Rotation	2,963 days
Rotational velocity (v sin i)	1.9 km/s
Age	2.7±0.6 Gyr

Other designations
- n Leonis, BD+14°2367, HD 97907, HIP 55016, HR 4365, WDS J11159+1318, TYC 861-1283-1

Database references
SIMBAD	data

73 Leonis (n Leonis) is a binary star in the constellation Leo. At a combined apparent magnitude of +5.32, it is faintly visible to the naked eye in ideal conditions. Parallax measurements by the Gaia spacecraft imply a distance of 460 light-years (142 parsecs).

== Characteristics ==
The binary nature of 73 Leonis was initially suggested in 1920, based on spectroscopic observations. The system was confirmed to be a binary by two studies from 1926 and 1928. The most modern determination of the orbital elements, as of 2025, combines spectroscopy, astrometry, and direct observations from interferometry. It finds that the stars orbit with a period of 8.1042 years, an eccentricity of 0.4251, and an inclination of 58.03°. The angular semi-major axis is 45.470 mas, which at the distance of 73 Leonis corresponds to 6.535 astronomical units. Given the relatively high eccentricity, the separation between components varies from 9.322 AU at apoastron to 3.749 AU to periastron. The combined mass of the pair is 4.24±0.37 M_{☉}.

The primary star dominates the energy output of the system. Its spectrum matches a spectral class of K2 III, with the luminosity class III indicating it is a giant star that has exhausted the hydrogen at its core. This star has around 26 times the radius of the Sun, radiating 195 times the Sun's luminosity from its photosphere at an effective temperature of 4,271 K, giving it the orange hue typical of a K-type star.

The secondary star is poorly characterized. It is 3.62 magnitudes fainter than the primary, and based on this difference it is estimated to have a spectral type of F6V, although it was never characterized spectroscopically to accurately determine its spectral type.
