= 60 Leonis =

Star in the constellation Leo

- Location of 60 Leonis (circled in red)

Observation data Epoch J2000 Equinox J2000
- Constellation: Leo
- Right ascension: 11^{h} 02^{m} 19.77577^{s}
- Declination: +20° 10′ 47.4265″
- Apparent magnitude (V): 4.398

Characteristics
- Evolutionary stage: main sequence
- Spectral type: A1 Vm
- U−B color index: +0.05
- B−V color index: +0.07

Astrometry
Radial velocity (R_{v})	−11.10±0.7 km/s
Proper motion (μ)	RA: −8.67 mas/yr Dec.: 39.07 mas/yr
Parallax (π)	25.73±0.18 mas
Distance	126.8 ± 0.9 ly (38.9 ± 0.3 pc)
Absolute magnitude (M_{V})	+1.47

Details
Mass	2.11±0.06 M_{☉}
Radius	1.80±0.07 R_{☉}
Luminosity	24.1±1.4 L_{☉}
Surface gravity (log g)	4.22±0.20 cgs
Temperature	9,540±180 K
Metallicity [Fe/H]	0.00±0.10 dex
Rotational velocity (v sin i)	17.2±2.0 km/s
Age	195±15 Myr

Other designations
- b Leo, 60 Leo, NSV 18592, AAVSO 1057+20, BD+20°2547, FK5 2880, HD 95608, HIP 53954, HR 4300, SAO 81637

Database references
SIMBAD	data

60 Leonis is a star in the zodiac constellation of Leo, located 127 light years from the Sun. It is visible to the naked eye as a faint, white-hued star with an apparent visual magnitude of 4.4. The star is moving closer to the Earth with a heliocentric radial velocity of −11 km/s.

This is an Am star with a stellar classification of A1 Vm, although LeBlanc et al. (2015) consider it an Ap star. The atmosphere displays clear indications of stratification of iron with no significant magnetic field detected. It is 195 million years old with a relatively low projected rotational velocity of 17 km/s. The star has 2.11 times the mass of the Sun and 1.80 times the Sun's radius. It is radiating 24.1 times the Sun's luminosity from its photosphere at an effective temperature of 9,540 K.
