= Nu Leonis =

Binary star system in the constellation Leo

ν Leonis
- Location of ν Leonis (circled)

Observation data Epoch J2000.0 Equinox J2000.0 (ICRS)
- Constellation: Leo
- Right ascension: 09^{h} 58^{m} 13.37557^{s}
- Declination: +12° 26′ 41.2865″
- Apparent magnitude (V): 5.15

Characteristics
- Spectral type: B6 IV
- U−B color index: −0.13
- B−V color index: −0.04

Astrometry
Radial velocity (R_{v})	+14.4 km/s
Proper motion (μ)	RA: −25.66 mas/yr Dec.: −15.56 mas/yr
Parallax (π)	6.53±0.24 mas
Distance	500 ± 20 ly (153 ± 6 pc)
Absolute magnitude (M_{V})	−0.66

Orbit
Period (P)	137.2978 d
Eccentricity (e)	0.7
Longitude of the node (Ω)	293.7°
Periastron epoch (T)	2419815.9 JD
Semi-amplitude (K_{1}) (primary)	20 km/s

Details
Mass	3.37±0.05 M_{☉}
Radius	2.3 R_{☉}
Luminosity	244 L_{☉}
Temperature	9,552 K
Rotational velocity (v sin i)	100 km/s

Other designations
- ν Leo, 27 Leo, BD+13°2183, HD 86360, HIP 48883, HR 3937, SAO 98876

Database references
SIMBAD	data

ν Leonis, Latinised as Nu Leonis, is a binary star system in the zodiac constellation of Leo. It is faintly visible to the naked eye with an apparent visual magnitude of 5.15; parallax measurements indicate it is around 500 light years away. At this distance, the visual extinction from interstellar dust is 0.33 magnitudes.

It is 0.05 degrees north of the ecliptic, so it can be occulted by the moon or planets.

This is a single-lined spectroscopic binary system with an orbital period of 137.3 days and an eccentricity of 0.7. The primary component is a B-type subgiant star with a stellar classification of B6 IV. It has about 3.37 times the mass of the Sun, 2.3 times the Sun's radius, and radiates 244 times the luminosity of the Sun from an outer atmosphere with an effective temperature of 9,552 K. The rotation rate is moderate with a projected rotational velocity of 100 km/s. Little is known about the companion.
