= Upsilon Leonis =

Star in the constellation Leo

υ Leonis
- Location of υ Leonis (circled in red)

Observation data Epoch J2000.0 Equinox ICRS
- Constellation: Leo
- Right ascension: 11^{h} 36^{m} 56.92983^{s}
- Declination: +00° 49′ 25.8758″
- Apparent magnitude (V): 4.33

Characteristics
- Evolutionary stage: red clump
- Spectral type: G9 III
- U−B color index: +0.76
- B−V color index: +1.00

Astrometry
Radial velocity (R_{v})	1.79±0.16 km/s
Proper motion (μ)	RA: +1.76 mas/yr Dec.: +43.37 mas/yr
Parallax (π)	17.97±0.22 mas
Distance	182 ± 2 ly (55.6 ± 0.7 pc)
Absolute magnitude (M_{V})	0.59

Details
Mass	2.58 M_{☉}
Radius	11.38±0.16 R_{☉}
Luminosity	56 L_{☉}
Surface gravity (log g)	2.7 cgs
Temperature	4,842 K
Metallicity [Fe/H]	–0.34 dex
Rotational velocity (v sin i)	0.0 km/s
Age	4.12±2.08 Gyr

Other designations
- υ Leo, 91 Leo, BD−00°2458, FK5 437, HD 100920, HIP 56647, HR 4471, SAO 138298

Database references
SIMBAD	data
Exoplanet Archive	data

Upsilon Leonis (υ Leo) is a star in the zodiac constellation of Leo. It is visible to the naked eye with an apparent visual magnitude of 4.33. The distance to this star, as determined using parallax measurements, is about 182 light years. At that distance, the visual magnitude of the star is diminished by an estimated extinction factor of 0^{m}.02 because of interstellar dust.

With an age of around 4 billion years, this star has evolved into a G-type giant star with a stellar classification of G9 III. It has 2.6 times the Sun's mass, but has expanded to 11.4 times the solar radius and shines with 56 times the luminosity of the Sun at an effective temperature of 4,842 K. The rate of rotation is too small to be measured, with a projected rotational velocity of 0.0 km/s. The chemical abundance of elements other than hydrogen and helium, what astronomers term the star's metallicity, is less than half that in the Sun. It is most likely a member of the galactic thin disk population.

== Planetary system ==
In 2021, a gas giant planet was detected by radial velocity method. In 2024, this object's true mass was measured using astrometry from the Gaia spacecraft. The method consists of taking the host star's RUWE level—an astrometirc indicator— from the astrometric solution. A large RUWE could imply that there is an unseen companion around the star, or that there are systematic calibration errors in the astrometric solution. Assuming the former scenario, the mass of Upsilon Leonis b is measured at 29.2 M_{J}, indicating that it is a brown dwarf, but the latter scenario is still a possibility, which means that this measured mass is likely an upper limit.

The Upsilon Leonis planetary system
Companion (in order from star)	Mass	Semimajor axis (AU)	Orbital period (days)	Eccentricity	Inclination (°)	Radius
b	≥0.51^{+0.06}_{−0.26} and ≤29.2 M_{J}	1.18^{+0.11}_{−0.32}	385.2^{+2.8}_{−1.3}	0.320^{+0.134}_{−0.218}	—	—
