= Xi Leonis =

Star in the constellation Leo

ξ Leonis
- Location of ξ Leonis (circled)

Observation data Epoch J2000.0 Equinox ICRS
- Constellation: Leo
- Right ascension: 09^{h} 31^{m} 56.74097^{s}
- Declination: +11° 17′ 59.3585″
- Apparent magnitude (V): 4.97

Characteristics
- Evolutionary stage: red clump
- Spectral type: K0 III
- U−B color index: +0.88
- B−V color index: +1.04
- Variable type: suspected

Astrometry
Radial velocity (R_{v})	34.85±0.26 km/s
Proper motion (μ)	RA: −101.446 mas/yr Dec.: −82.543 mas/yr
Parallax (π)	14.2602±0.1106 mas
Distance	229 ± 2 ly (70.1 ± 0.5 pc)
Absolute magnitude (M_{V})	0.663

Details
Mass	2.8 M_{☉}
Radius	12 R_{☉}
Luminosity	60 L_{☉}
Surface gravity (log g)	2.7 cgs
Temperature	4,688 K
Metallicity [Fe/H]	−0.17 dex
Rotational velocity (v sin i)	1.0 km/s
Age	3.89±2.03 Gyr

Other designations
- ξ Leo, 5 Leo, BD+11°2053, HD 82395, HIP 46771, HR 3782, SAO 98627

Database references
SIMBAD	data

Xi Leonis (ξ Leo, ξ Leonis) is a solitary star in the zodiac constellation of Leo. It has an apparent visual magnitude of 5.0 and is faintly visible to the naked eye. The distance to this star, as determined by parallax measurements, is roughly 229 light years.

This is an evolved, K-type giant star with a stellar classification of K0 III. At an age of around four billion years, it has expanded to 12 times the radius of the Sun and shines with 60 times the Sun's luminosity. The effective temperature of the star's outer atmosphere is 4,688. In the General Catalogue of Variable Stars, it is listed as a suspected variable star based on a 1929 paper.
