= Eta Leonis =

Binary star system in the constellation Leo

- Location of η Leo (circled)

Observation data Epoch J2000 Equinox ICRS
- Constellation: Leo
- Right ascension: 10^{h} 07^{m} 19.9519^{s}
- Declination: +16° 45′ 45.592″
- Apparent magnitude (V): 3.486

Characteristics
- Evolutionary stage: Blue supergiant (blue loop)
- Spectral type: A0 Ib
- U−B color index: −0.206
- B−V color index: −0.026

Astrometry
Radial velocity (R_{v})	1.40 km/s
Proper motion (μ)	RA: −2.80 mas/yr Dec.: −1.82 mas/yr
Parallax (π)	2.57±0.16 mas
Distance	1,270 ± 80 ly (390 ± 20 pc)
Absolute magnitude (M_{V})	−5.54

Details
Mass	10 M_{☉}
Radius	47 R_{☉}
Luminosity	19,000 L_{☉}
Surface gravity (log g)	2.00 cgs
Temperature	9,600 K
Metallicity	−0.04
Rotational velocity (v sin i)	2 km/s
Age	25 Myr

Other designations
- η Leo, 30 Leonis, HR 3975, BD+17°2171, HD 87737, FK5 379, HIP 49583, SAO 98955, GC 13899

Database references
SIMBAD	data

Eta Leonis (η Leo, η Leonis) is a third-magnitude blue supergiant star in the constellation Leo, about 1,270 light years away.

== Nomenclature ==
With Regulus, γ Leonis (Algieba), and ζ Leonis (Adhafera), it formed the Arabic lunar mansion Al Jabhah, the forehead (of the lion). Some sources apply the name Al Jabhah to this star specifically, though the name Algieba for γ Leonis has the same etymology.

== Properties ==
Eta Leonis is a blue supergiant with the stellar classification A0Ib. Since 1943, the spectrum of this star has served as one of the stable anchor points by which other stars are classified. Though its apparent magnitude is 3.5, making it a relatively dim star to the naked eye, it is nearly 20,000 times more luminous than the Sun, with an absolute magnitude of -5.60. The Hipparcos astrometric data has estimated the distance of Eta Leonis to be roughly 390 parsecs from Earth, or 1,270 light years away. It is believed to be in a blue loop phase.

Eta Leonis is apparently a multiple star system, but the number of components and their separation is uncertain.
