= 35 Leonis =

Binary star system in the constellation of Leo

- Approximate location of 35 Leonis (circled)

Observation data Epoch J2000 Equinox J2000
- Constellation: Leo
- Right ascension: 10^{h} 16^{m} 32.289^{s}
- Declination: +23° 30′ 11.21″
- Apparent magnitude (V): 5.97

Characteristics

35 Leonis A
- Evolutionary stage: subgiant
- Spectral type: G1.5IV–V
- Apparent magnitude (U): 6.8
- Apparent magnitude (B): 6.6
- Apparent magnitude (R): 5.6
- Apparent magnitude (G): 5.8
- Apparent magnitude (J): 4.8
- Apparent magnitude (H): 4.5
- Apparent magnitude (K): 4.3

B
- Evolutionary stage: Red dwarf
- Apparent magnitude (K): 8.4

Astrometry
Radial velocity (R_{v})	−35.25±0.79 km/s
Proper motion (μ)	RA: −200.342±0.259 mas/yr Dec.: 32.03±0.32 mas/yr
Parallax (π)	33.7721±0.258 mas
Distance	96.6 ± 0.7 ly (29.6 ± 0.2 pc)
Absolute magnitude (M_{V})	+3.56

Orbit
Primary	A
Period (P)	1.471 years (537 days)

Details

A
Mass	1.34 M_{☉}
Radius	2.12±0.18 R_{☉}
Luminosity	4.37+0.76 −0.65 L_{☉}
Surface gravity (log g)	3.87±0.02 cgs
Temperature	5480±10 K
Metallicity [Fe/H]	0.02±0.01 dex
Rotational velocity (v sin i)	2.68±0.97 km/s
Age	5.25+0.64 −0.57 Gyr

B
Mass	0.15 M_{☉}
Temperature	3300+130 −140 K
Rotational velocity (v sin i)	<10.1 km/s

Position (relative to A)
Component	B
Angular distance	56.9±0.3 mas

Other designations
- BD+24 2207, HD 89010, HIP 50319, HR 4030, SAO 81260, PPM 100216, WDS J10167+2325B, NLTT 23866, TYC 1969-1260-1, IRAS 10137+2345, 2MASS J10163231+2330111, Gaia DR2 725469767850488064, Gaia DR3 725469767850488064

Database references
SIMBAD	data

35 Leonis (HIP 53019, HD 89010) is a spectroscopic binary star system located in the constellation of Leo, next to the star Zeta Leonis. It is located 96.5 ly (29.6 pc) from Earth based upon parallax measurements. The system consists of a G-type star (yellow dwarf) and a red dwarf star. With an apparent magnitude of 5.97, it can be naked-eye visible only from dark skies.

== Properties ==
35 Leonis was discovered to be a binary system in 2024, after analysis from Daniel Echeverri et al. using vortex fiber nulling, which is a technique for detecting and characterizing faint stellar companions that are close to their parent star. The team derived a visual separation of 56.9 milliarcseconds between both components using the CHARA array. Both stars are completing one orbit around each other every 537 days (1.47 years). The system classifies as a single-lined spectroscopic binary (SB1).

35 Leonis the Flamsteed designation. Other designations for this system include HD 89010 from the Henry Draper Catalogue, HIP 53019 from the Hipparcos Catalogue and HR 4030 from the Bright Star Catalogue.

=== 35 Leonis A ===
The main component, 35 Leonis A, is currently a main-sequence star that is evolving into a subgiant, based on its spectral class of G1.5V-IV. It has 34% more mass than the Sun, 2.12 times the radius of the Sun, and irradiates four times more luminosity than it. The effective temperature of 35 Leonis A is 5480 K, which gives it the typical hue of a G-type star. The age of the star is around 5.25 billion years, which is around 14% older than the Solar System.

=== 35 Leonis B ===
The secondary component, 35 Leonis B, is a red dwarf star. The mass of 35 Leonis B is estimated at 0.15 M_{☉}, based on a mass of 1.34 M_{☉} for the primary and a mass ratio of 0.11. An effective temperature of 3300+130
−140 K and an upper limit in the rotational velocity of 10.1 km/s are derived from the vortex fiber nulling's parameters. Other characteristics, such as the radius and luminosity, are unknown.
