= Regulus =

Brightest star in the constellation Leo

- Location of Regulus (circled)

Observation data Epoch J2000 Equinox ICRS
- Constellation: Leo
- Pronunciation: UK: /ˈrɛɡˌjulʊs/ US: /ˈrɛɡˌjʊlʊsˌ/
- Regulus A
- Right ascension: 10^{h} 08^{m} 22.311^{s}
- Declination: +11° 58′ 01.95″
- Apparent magnitude (V): 1.40
- Regulus B
- Right ascension: 10^{h} 08^{m} 12.788^{s}
- Declination: +11° 59′ 49.06″
- Apparent magnitude (V): 8.13
- Regulus C
- Right ascension: 10^{h} 08^{m} 12.897^{s}
- Declination: +11° 59′ 48.88″
- Apparent magnitude (V): 13.50

Characteristics

Regulus A
- Evolutionary stage: Blue straggler
- Spectral type: B8 IVn
- U−B color index: −0.36
- B−V color index: −0.11
- Variable type: Suspected

Regulus BC
- Evolutionary stage: Main sequence
- Spectral type: K2 V + M4 V
- U−B color index: +0.51
- B−V color index: +0.86

Astrometry

A
Radial velocity (R_{v})	4.39±0.09 km/s
Proper motion (μ)	RA: −248.73±0.35 mas/yr Dec.: 5.59±0.21 mas/yr
Parallax (π)	41.13±0.35 mas
Distance	79.3 ± 0.7 ly (24.3 ± 0.2 pc)
Absolute magnitude (M_{V})	−0.57

Astrometry

B
Radial velocity (R_{v})	+6.72 km/s
Proper motion (μ)	RA: −254.399 mas/yr Dec.: 8.127 mas/yr
Parallax (π)	41.2745±0.0270 mas
Distance	79.02 ± 0.05 ly (24.23 ± 0.02 pc)
Absolute magnitude (M_{V})	6.20

C
Proper motion (μ)	RA: −224.824 mas/yr Dec.: +9.091 mas/yr
Parallax (π)	41.2424±0.0589 mas
Distance	79.1 ± 0.1 ly (24.25 ± 0.03 pc)
Absolute magnitude (M_{V})	11.56

Orbit
Primary	α Leo Aa (HD 87901 A)
Secondary	α Leo Ab (HD 87901 B)
Period (P)	40.102±0.002 d
Semi-major axis (a)	74 R_{☉}
Eccentricity (e)	0 (assumed)
Semi-amplitude (K_{1}) (primary)	7.58±0.12 km/s

Details

Aa
Mass	4.15±0.06 M_{☉}
Radius	4.21+0.07 −0.06 (equatorial), 3.22+0.05 −0.06 (polar) R_{☉}
Luminosity	341+27 −28 L_{☉}
Surface gravity (log g)	3.54±0.09 cgs
Temperature	11,010 (equatorial), 14,520 (polar) K
Metallicity [Fe/H]	+0.21 dex
Rotation	15.9 hours
Rotational velocity (v sin i)	318±8 km/s
Age	≳1 Gyr

Ab
Mass	0.31±0.10 M_{☉}
Radius	0.061±0.011 R_{☉}
Temperature	20,000±4,000 K

B
Mass	0.794±0.040 M_{☉}
Radius	0.778±0.017 R_{☉}
Luminosity	0.322±0.005 L_{☉}
Surface gravity (log g)	4.527 cgs
Temperature	4,968+1 −3 K
Metallicity [Fe/H]	−0.21 dex

C
Mass	0.315±0.025 M_{☉}
Radius	0.332±0.023 R_{☉}
Luminosity	0.0206±0.0006 L_{☉}
Temperature	3,783±126 K

Other designations
- α Leonis, 32 Leonis, GJ 9316, HR 3982, ADS 7654, WDS J10084+1158
- α Leo A: BD+12°2149, FK5 380, HD 87901, HIP 49669, SAO 98967, LTT 12716
- α Leo B/C: BD+12°2147, HD 87884, SAO 98966, LTT 12714

Database references
SIMBAD	Regulus
- B
- C

Regulus is the brightest object in the constellation Leo and one of the brightest stars in the night sky. It has the Bayer designation designated α Leonis, which is Latinized to Alpha Leonis, and abbreviated Alpha Leo or α Leo. Regulus appears single, but is actually a quadruple star system composed of four stars that are organized into two pairs. The system lies approximately 79 light years (24.2 parsecs) from the Solar System.

The spectroscopic binary Regulus A consists of a blue-white main-sequence star and its companion, a pre-white dwarf. Regulus BC, also known as HD 87884, is separated from Regulus A by 176″ and is itself a close pair.

Regulus and five slightly dimmer stars (Zeta Leonis, Mu Leonis, Gamma Leonis, Epsilon Leonis, and Eta Leonis) have collectively been called 'the Sickle', which is an asterism that marks the head of Leo.

== Nomenclature ==
α Leonis (Latinized to Alpha Leonis) is the star system's Bayer designation. The traditional name Rēgulus is Latin for 'prince' or 'little king'. In 2016, the International Astronomical Union organized a Working Group on Star Names (WGSN) to catalog and standardize proper names for stars. The WGSN's first bulletin of July 2016 included a table of the first two batches of names approved by the WGSN; which included Regulus for this star. It is now so entered in the IAU Catalog of Star Names.

== Observation ==
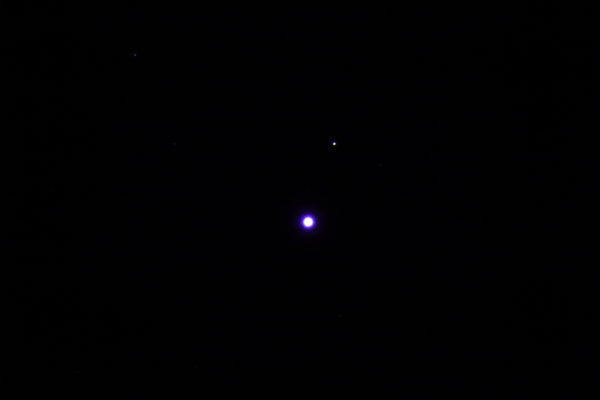
Regulus through Celestron CGEM DX 1100 @ F6.3, Canon T3i, Televue 4X Powermate, ISO 800, 30 sec exposure

The Regulus system as a whole is the twenty-first brightest star in the night sky with an apparent magnitude of +1.35. The light output is dominated by Regulus A. Regulus B, if seen in isolation, would be a binocular object of magnitude +8.1, and its companion, Regulus C, the faintest of the three stars that has been directly observed, would require a substantial telescope to be seen, at magnitude +13.5. Regulus A is itself a spectroscopic binary; the secondary star has not yet been directly observed as it is much fainter than the primary. The BC pair lies at an angular distance of 177 arc-seconds from Regulus A, making them visible in amateur telescopes.

Regulus is 0.465 degrees from the ecliptic, the closest of the bright stars, and is often occulted by the Moon. This occurs in spates every 9.3 years, due to lunar precession. The last spate was in 2026, each one limited to certain areas on Earth.

The moon moving in front of Regulus as seen on February 2nd 2026 from Newark, Delaware.

Occultations by Mercury and Venus are possible but rare, as are occultations by asteroids. Seven other stars which have a Bayer designation are less than 0.9° from the ecliptic—the next brightest of these is δ (Delta) Geminorum, of magnitude +3.53.

The last occultation of Regulus by a planet was on July 7, 1959, by Venus. The next will occur on October 1, 2044, also by Venus. Other planets will not occult Regulus over the next few millennia because of their node positions. An occultation of Regulus by the asteroid 166 Rhodope was filmed in Italy on October 19, 2005. Differential bending of light was measured to be consistent with general relativity. Regulus was occulted by the asteroid 163 Erigone in the early morning of March 20, 2014. The center of the shadow path passed through New York and eastern Ontario, but no one is known to have seen it, due to cloud cover. The International Occultation Timing Association recorded no observations at all.

Although best seen in the evening in the northern hemisphere's late winter and spring, Regulus appears at some time of night throughout the year except for about a month (depending on ability to compensate for the Sun's glare, ideally done so in twilight) on either side of August 22–24, when the Sun is too close. The star can be viewed the whole night, crossing the sky, in late February. Regulus passes through SOHO's LASCO C3 every August.

For Earth observers, the heliacal rising (pre-sunrise appearance) of Regulus occurs late in the first week of September, or in the second week. Every 8 years, Venus passes very near the star system around or a few days before the heliacal rising, as on 5 September 2022 (the superior conjunction of Venus happens about two days earlier with each turn of its 8-year cycle, so as this cycle continues Venus will more definitely pass Regulus before the star's heliacal rising).

== Stellar system ==
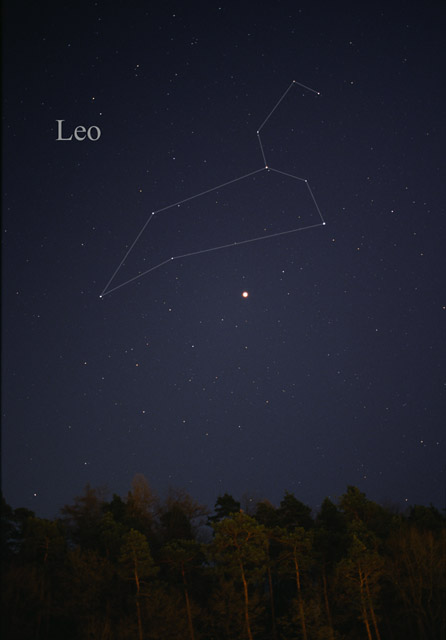
Regulus is the brightest star in the constellation of Leo (right tip, below is bright Jupiter in 2004).

Regulus is a multiple star system consisting of at least four stars and a substellar object. Regulus A is the dominant star, with a binary companion 177" distant that is thought to be physically related. Regulus D is a 12th magnitude companion at 212", but is an unrelated background object.

Regulus A is a binary star consisting of a blue-white subgiant star of spectral type B8, which is orbited by a star of at least 0.3 solar masses, which is probably a white dwarf. The two stars take approximately 40 days to complete an orbit around their common centre of mass. Given the extremely distorted shape of the primary, the relative orbital motion may be notably altered with respect to the two-body purely Keplerian scenario because of non-negligible long-term orbital perturbations affecting, for example, its orbital period. In other words, Kepler's third law, which holds exactly only for two point-like masses, would no longer be valid for the Regulus system. Regulus A was long thought to be fairly young, only 50–100 million years old, calculated by comparing its temperature, luminosity, and mass. The existence of a white dwarf companion would mean that the system is at least 1 billion years old, just to account for the formation of the white dwarf. The discrepancy can be accounted for by a history of mass transfer onto a once-smaller Regulus A.

The primary of Regulus A has about 4.15 times the Sun's mass. It is spinning extremely rapidly, with a rotation period of only 15.9 hours (for comparison, the rotation period of the Sun is 25 days), which causes it to have a highly oblate shape. This results in so-called gravity darkening: the photosphere at Regulus's poles is considerably hotter, and five times brighter per unit surface area, than its equatorial region. The star's surface at the equator rotates at about 320 kilometres per second (199 miles per second), or 96.5% of its critical angular velocity for break-up. It is emitting polarized light because of this.

Regulus BC is 5,000 AU from Regulus A. A and BC share a common proper motion and are thought to orbit each other taking several million years. Designated Regulus B and Regulus C, the pair has Henry Draper Catalogue number HD 87884. The first is a K2V star, while the second is about M4V. The companion pair has an orbital period of about 600 years with a separation of 2.5" in 1942.

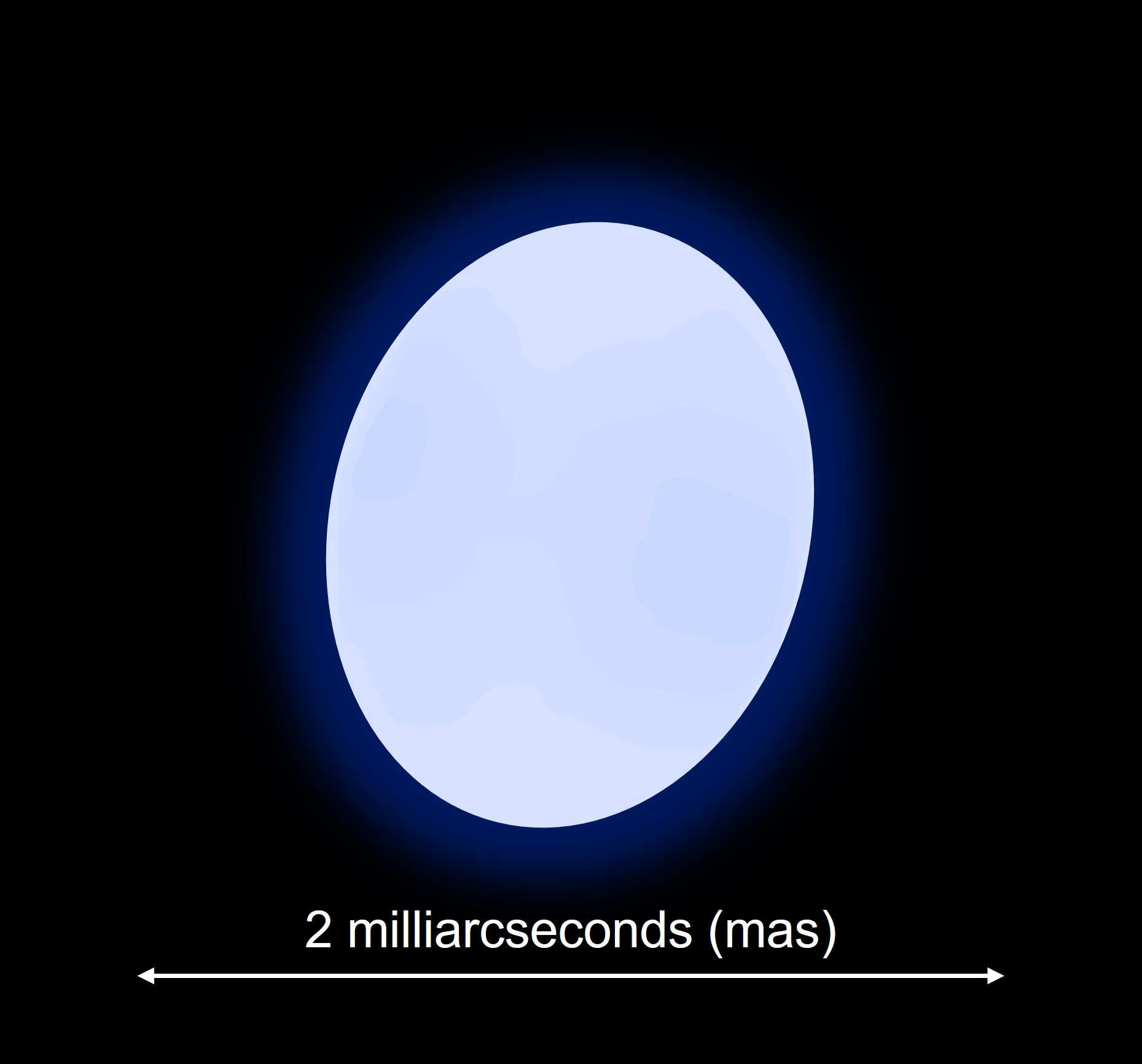
Approximate true-color reconstruction of Regulus based on interferometric imaging

A far more widely-separated brown dwarf, at 7.55°, named SDSS J1007+1930 (SDSS J100711.74+193056.2) may be bound to the Regulus system, since it shares a similar proper motion and radial velocity and has a similar metal abundance to Regulus B, which hints for a physical connection between both systems. The estimated distance from Regulus is 3.9+0.6
−0.5 parsecs (12.6+2.0
−1.5 ly), and the orbital period assuming a circular orbit would be around 200 million years, comparable to the Sun's orbital period around the Milky Way (galactic year). It is estimated to have a mass of roughly 60 M_{J} (0.06 M_{☉}), (Note: Assuming an age of one billion years. This mass is below the hydrogen burning limit and makes SDSS J100711.74+193056.2 substellar, unable to fuse hydrogen and become a dim star.) an effective temperature of 1,600 K and a spectral type L9 or T0, making it a L dwarf or T dwarf. It may once have been closer and got ejected by dynamical interactions, and may be stripped away by future stellar encounters because it is so weakly bound to the system. The extreme distance makes it uncertain to conclude whether it is gravitationally bound to Regulus.

Regulus system
			Separation (arcsec)	Projected separation (AU)	Orbital period	Spectral type	Mass (M_{☉})	App. mag. (V)
Regulus ABC	Regulus A (Note: Regulus A and B are separated by 180 arcseconds, resulting in a projected separation of 4400 AU/0.07 light years. The combined binary system may have an approximate orbital period of 130,000 years.)	Regulus Aa	0.015	0.356	40.1 days	B8 IVn	4.15	1.4 (combined)
Regulus ABC	Regulus A	Regulus Ab	0.015	0.356	40.1 days	pre-WD	0.31	1.4 (combined)
Regulus ABC	Regulus BC	Regulus B	2.1	60	600 years	K2V	0.78	8.1
Regulus ABC	Regulus BC	Regulus C	2.1	60	600 years	M4V	0.32	13.5
SDSS J1007+1930			27,200	800,000	200 million years	L9	0.06	26

== Etymology and cultural associations ==
Rēgulus is Latin for 'prince' or 'little king'; its Greek equivalent is Basiliskos or, in Latinised form, Basiliscus. The name Regulus first appeared in the early 16th century. It is also known as Qalb al-Asad, from the Arabic قلب الأسد, meaning 'the heart of the lion', a name already attested in the Greek Kardia Leontos whose Latin equivalent is Cor Leōnis. The Arabic phrase is sometimes approximated as Kabelaced.

In Chinese, it is known as the Fourteenth Star of Xuanyuan (軒轅十四; Xuānyuán Shísì), the Yellow Emperor. It is the determinative star of the Xuanyuan constellation, and is also called Nüzhu, representing the emperor's wife, the queen. The stars on either side and slightly to the south of Regulus, ο Leonis and ρ Leonis, are called Taimin and Shaomin, and the star between them, 31 Leonis, is Yunü. In Indian astronomy, Regulus is the main star of the nakshatra Maghā ("the bountiful").

Babylonians called it Sharru ("the King"), and it marked the 15th ecliptic constellation. In India it was known as Maghā ("the Mighty"), in Sogdiana Magh ("the Great"), in Persia Miyan ("the Centre") and also as one of the four 'royal stars' of the Persian monarchy. It was one of the fifteen Behenian stars known to medieval astrologers, associated with granite, mugwort, and the kabbalistic symbol.

In the Babylonian MUL.APIN, Regulus is listed as Lugal, meaning king, with co-descriptor, "star of the Lion's breast".

== See also ==
- Table of stars with Bayer designations
- List of nearest B-type stars
