= Omicron Leonis =

Multiple star in the constellation Leo

- Location of ο Leonis (circled in red)

Observation data Epoch J2000.0 Equinox ICRS
- Constellation: Leo
- Right ascension: 09^{h} 41^{m} 09.032^{s}
- Declination: +09° 53′ 32.31″
- Apparent magnitude (V): +3.52

Characteristics
- Spectral type: F8-G0III + A7m
- U−B color index: 0.21
- B−V color index: 0.49

Astrometry
Proper motion (μ)	RA: -143.20 mas/yr Dec.: -37.20 mas/yr
Parallax (π)	24.412±0.081 mas
Distance	133.53±0.45 ly (40.96±0.14 pc)
Absolute magnitude (M_{V})	+0.51

Orbit
Primary	Aa
Name	Ab
Period (P)	14.498068(6) days
Semi-major axis (a)	0.1834±0.0007 AU
Eccentricity (e)	0.0007±0.0004
Inclination (i)	57.8±0.2°
Longitude of the node (Ω)	191.6±0.1°
Periastron epoch (T)	2450623.9(9) days
Argument of periastron (ω) (secondary)	214±22°
Semi-amplitude (K_{1}) (primary)	54.75±0.02 km/s
Semi-amplitude (K_{2}) (secondary)	61.66±0.02 km/s

Details

ο Leo Aa
Mass	2.074±0.013 M_{☉}
Radius	5.73±0.34 R_{☉}
Luminosity	41.1+5.8 −5.1 L_{☉}
Temperature	6,107±93 K
Metallicity [Fe/H]	0.11±0.10 dex
Age	1.06±0.03 Gyr

ο Leo Ab
Mass	1.841±0.011 M_{☉}
Radius	2.43±0.35 R_{☉}
Luminosity	17.8+5.7 −4.3 L_{☉}
Temperature	7,600±200 K
Metallicity [Fe/H]	0.11±0.10 dex
Age	1.06±0.03 Gyr

Other designations
- Subra, ο Leo, 14 Leo, BD+10 2044, FK5 365, HD 83808, HD 83809, HIP 47508, HR 3852, SAO 98709

Database references
SIMBAD	data

Omicron Leonis (ο Leonis, abbreviated Omicron Leo, ο Leo) is a binary star in the constellation of Leo, west of Regulus, some 130 light-years from the Sun, where it marks one of the lion's forepaws. The position of this system near the ecliptic means it is subject to lunar occultation.

The system consists of Omicron Leonis Aa (officially named Subra /ˈsuːbrə/, the traditional name for the system) and Omicron Leonis Ab.

== Nomenclature ==
ο Leonis (Latinised to Omicron Leonis) is the star's Bayer designation. The designations of the two constituents as Omicron Leonis A and B, and those of A's components—Omicron Leonis Aa and Ab—derive from the convention used by the Washington Multiplicity Catalog (WMC) for multiple star systems, and adopted by the International Astronomical Union (IAU).

It bore the traditional name Subra, from the Arabic زبرة zubra (upper part of the back), originally applied to Delta and Theta Leonis.

In 2016, the International Astronomical Union organized a Working Group on Star Names (WGSN) to catalogue and standardize proper names for stars. The WGSN decided to attribute proper names to individual stars rather than entire multiple systems. It approved the name Subra for the component Omicron Leonis Aa on 12 September 2016 and it is now so included in the List of IAU-approved Star Names.

In Chinese astronomy, Omicron Leonis is named Taimin (太民); it and ρ Leonis (Shaomin, 少民) are the two southernmost stars of the Xuanyuan (轩辕) constellation.

== Properties ==
The two members of the spectroscopic pair have similar brightnesses, but are very different stars: the primary is given the type F8-G0III giant; and the secondary is a type A7m dwarf. Their combined apparent magnitude is +3.52.

The system has an optical companion, component B, a much fainter star that has increased its separation from about an arc-minute to one and a half arc-minutes in the 350 years since it was first measured. It is only close in the line of sight, being an unrelated background star which is a little more massive and hotter than the Sun.
