= Rho Leonis =

Variable star in the constellation Leo

ρ Leonis
- Location of ρ Leonis (circled)

Observation data Epoch J2000 Equinox ICRS
- Constellation: Leo
- Right ascension: 10^{h} 32^{m} 48.67168^{s}
- Declination: +09° 18′ 23.7094″
- Apparent magnitude (V): 3.83 - 3.90

Characteristics
- Evolutionary stage: Blue loop
- Spectral type: B1 Iab
- U−B color index: −0.945
- B−V color index: −0.153
- Variable type: α Cyg

Astrometry
Radial velocity (R_{v})	+42.0 km/s
Proper motion (μ)	RA: −5.93±0.20 mas/yr Dec.: −3.40±0.11 mas/yr
Distance	2,900±230 ly (900±70 pc)
Absolute magnitude (M_{V})	−6.19±0.2

Details
Mass	19.9±1.0 M_{☉}
Radius	28±3 R_{☉}
Luminosity	151,000+30,600 −25,500 L_{☉}
Surface gravity (log g)	2.87±0.04 cgs
Temperature	21,700±200 K
Metallicity [Fe/H]	−0.06 dex
Rotation	12.5±0.7 days
Rotational velocity (v sin i)	49.0±2.4 km/s
Age	9.12+0.88 −0.91 Myr

Other designations
- Shaomin, ρ Leo, 47 Leo, BD+10 2166, FK5 396, HD 91316, HIP 51624, HR 4133, SAO 118355

Database references
SIMBAD	data

Rho Leonis, also named Shaomin /ʃaʊmiːn/, is a star in the zodiac constellation of Leo, and, like the prominent nearby star Regulus, is near the ecliptic. With an apparent visual magnitude of 3.9, this star can be readily seen with the naked eye. Spectroscopic measurements give a distance estimate of about 2,930 light-years (900 parsecs) from the Earth. Rho Leonis is an Alpha Cygni-type variable star, showing 0.032 magnitude brightness variations with a period of 3.427 days, in Hipparcos data.

== Nomenclature ==
ρ Leonis (Latinized to Rho Leonis, abbreviated ρ Leo, Rho Leo) is the star's Bayer designation.

Rho Leonis has the traditional Chinese name Shaomin (少民); it and ο Leonis (Taimin, 太民) are the two southernmost stars of the Xuanyuan (轩辕) constellation. The IAU Working Group on Star Names approved the name Shaomin for ρ Leonis on 18 July 2024 and it is now so entered in the IAU Catalog of Star Names; ο Leonis has the IAU-approved name Subra.

== Characteristics ==
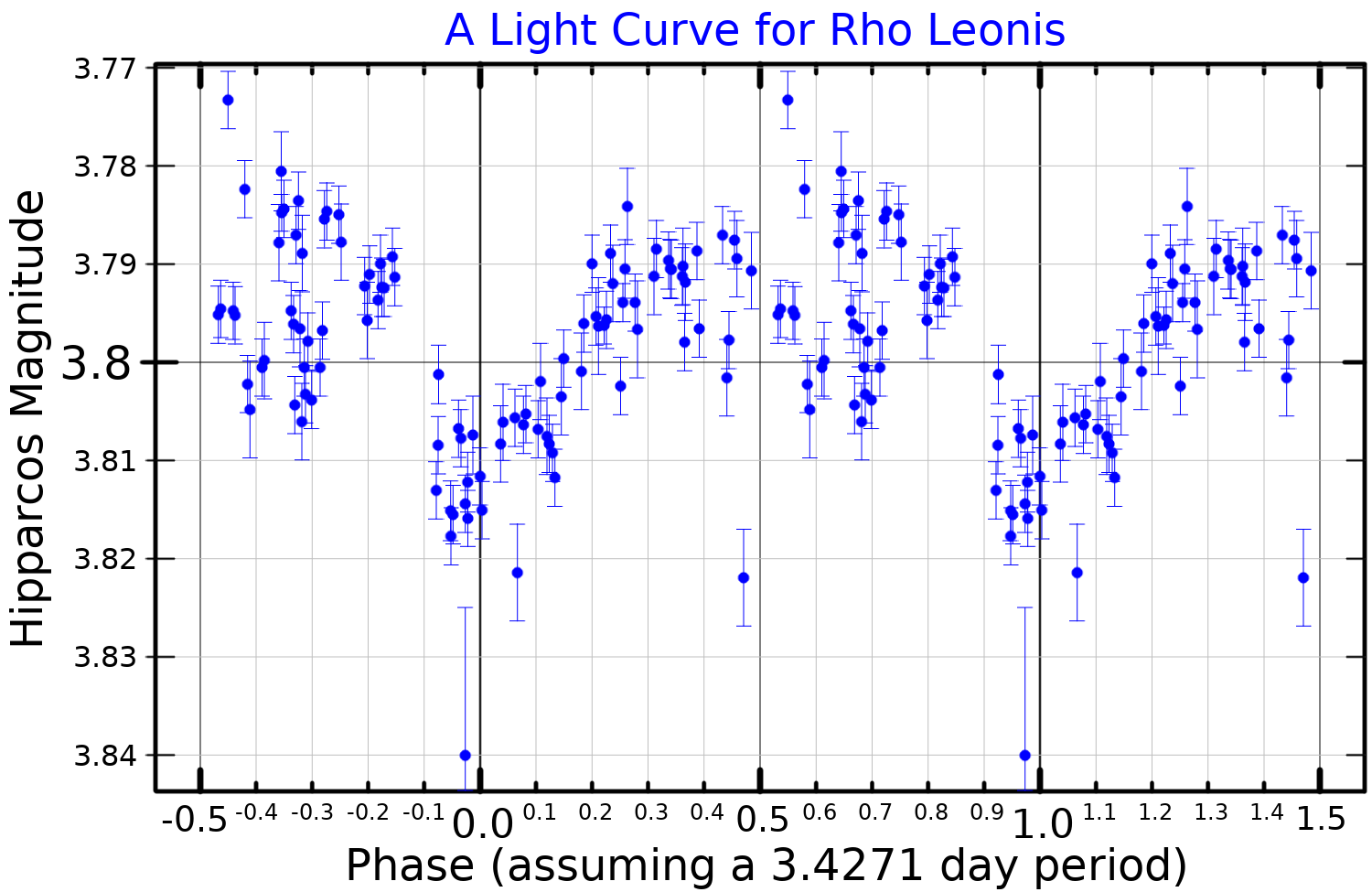
A light curve for Rho Leonis, plotted from Hipparcos data

The spectrum of Rho Leonis matches a stellar classification of B1 Iab, with the 'Iab' luminosity class indicating that it is a supergiant star. Rho Leonis is a former red supergiant that shifted back to hotter temperatures, being in the evolutionary stage known as the blue loop.

This is an enormous star with about 20 times the Sun's mass (M_{☉}) and 28 times the Sun's radius (R_{☉}). Rho Leonis is radiating about 150,000 times the Sun's luminosity (L_{☉}) at an effective temperature of 21,700 K, giving it the blue-white hue typical of a B-type star. A strong stellar wind is expelling mass from the outer envelope at a rate of 3.5×10^{−7} M_{☉} per year, or the equivalent of 1 M_{☉} every 2.8 million years. The rotation rate is about once per 12.5 days. The star rotates at an angle of 21.7°+0.5°
−0.4° relative to Earth.

Rho Leonis is classified as a runaway star, which means it has a peculiar velocity of at least 30 km s^{−1} relative to the surrounding stars. It has radial velocity of 42 km s^{−1} away from the Sun and a proper motion that is carrying it about 1.56 astronomical units per year, equivalent to 7 km s^{−1}, (Note: An Astronomical Unit (AU) is 1.5×10^{8} km, while a year is 3.2×10^{7} s. Thus, 1.56 AU/year = (1.56 AU/yr) × (1.5×10^{8} km/AU) / (3.2×10^{7} s/yr) = 7 km/s.) in a transverse direction. The star is situated about 2,300 light-years (710 parsecs) above the galactic plane.

The star is 0.15 degree north of the ecliptic, so it can be occulted by the moon. Unusual light variation during these occultations has been explained as the result of a possible close companion, which would be just over one magnitude fainter and separated by 0.01 arcsec. It has not been detected by any other means although it should be easily detected with modern observations. Speckle interferometry observations made during 2009 to 2023 did not detect the companion, strongly indicating that it does not exist. However, there is evidence for a companion from spectroscopic observations, which could be interpreted as radial pulsations or the presence of a secondary star that periodically exchange mass with the primary and has its own circumstellar disk.
