= 40 Leonis =

Star in the constellation Leo

- Location of 40 Leonis (circled in red)

Observation data Epoch J2000.0 Equinox J2000.0
- Constellation: Leo
- Right ascension: 10^{h} 19^{m} 44.16688^{s}
- Declination: +19° 28′ 15.2943″
- Apparent magnitude (V): 4.80

Characteristics
- Evolutionary stage: main sequence
- Spectral type: F6 IV-V
- U−B color index: +0.01
- B−V color index: +0.45

Astrometry
Radial velocity (R_{v})	5.9±0.1 km/s
Proper motion (μ)	RA: −231.73 mas/yr Dec.: −214.33 mas/yr
Parallax (π)	46.80±0.24 mas
Distance	69.7 ± 0.4 ly (21.4 ± 0.1 pc)
Absolute magnitude (M_{V})	3.13

Details
Mass	1.35±0.06 M_{☉}
Radius	1.68±0.07 R_{☉}
Luminosity	4.4±0.9 L_{☉}
Habitable zone inner limit	1.49 AU
Habitable zone outer limit	3.46 AU
Surface gravity (log g)	4.11±0.02 cgs
Temperature	6,450±140 K
Metallicity [Fe/H]	0.09±0.03 dex
Rotational velocity (v sin i)	17±2 km/s
Age	2.63±0.21 Gyr

Other designations
- 40 Leo, BD+20°2466, HD 89449, HIP 50564, HR 4054, SAO 99065

Database references
SIMBAD	data

40 Leonis is a spectroscopic binary system in the zodiac constellation of Leo. It is faintly visible to the naked eye, having an apparent visual magnitude of 4.80. An annual parallax shift of 46.80 mas, as seen from Earth's orbit, yields a distance estimate of 69.7 light years. It is moving away from the Sun with a radial velocity of 5.9 km/s and has a relatively high proper motion, traversing the sky at the rate of 0.315 arcseconds per year.

The visible component is an F-type star with a stellar classification of F6 IV-V, which indicates the spectrum shows traits of both a main sequence star and a more evolved subgiant star. It is a suspected Delta Scuti variable and shows a depleted lithium abundance. The star is about 2.6 billion years old with a relatively high rate of spin for its age, showing a projected rotational velocity of about 17 km/s. It has 1.35 times the mass of the Sun and 1.68 times the Sun's radius. 40 Leonis is radiating around 4.4 times the Sun's luminosity from its photosphere at an effective temperature of roughly 6,450 K.

40 Leonis was reported as a single-lined spectroscopic binary in 2003, but with no details regarding the orbit or the companion's nature. An X-ray emission with a luminosity of (1.09±0.38)×10^{29} erg/s has been detected at the star's position, which may be coming from a short-period, low-mass companion.

There are two common proper motion companions to 40 Leonis, NLTT 23781 and NLTT 23782, with a combined magnitude of 16.48, a spectral class of M5 and a wide angular separation from the primary of 5,230″ (1.453°), corresponding to a projected separation of 110,000 AU (1.7 ly). They form a visual binary with a separation of 5.24" from each other. Later data has shown that the companions are much farther away than the primary and therefore do not form a gravitationally bound system.

40 Leonis presents a significant difference on proper motion measurements taken by the Hipparcos and Gaia spacecraft, suggesting the presence of a giant planet.

== See also ==
- List of stars in Leo
