= Epsilon Leonis =

Star in the constellation Leo

- Location of ε Leonis (circled)

Observation data Epoch J2000 Equinox ICRS
- Constellation: Leo
- Right ascension: 09^{h} 45^{m} 51.07330^{s}
- Declination: +23° 46′ 27.3208″
- Apparent magnitude (V): 2.98

Characteristics
- Evolutionary stage: Red-giant branch
- Spectral type: G1 IIIa
- U−B color index: +0.47
- B−V color index: +0.808
- Variable type: suspected

Astrometry
Radial velocity (R_{v})	4.86 ± 0.33 km/s
Proper motion (μ)	RA: –45.61 mas/yr Dec.: –9.21 mas/yr
Parallax (π)	13.22±0.15 mas
Distance	247 ± 3 ly (75.6 ± 0.9 pc)
Absolute magnitude (M_{V})	–1.49

Details
Mass	3.71±0.04 M_{☉}
Radius	21.03+0.31 −0.32 R_{☉}
Luminosity	282±13 L_{☉}
Surface gravity (log g)	2.36±0.05 cgs
Temperature	5,314±17 K
Metallicity [Fe/H]	−0.03±0.11 dex
Rotational velocity (v sin i)	8.1 km/s
Age	210±0 Myr

Other designations
- Algenubi, Ras Elased Australis, ε Leo, 17 Leo, BD+24°2129, FK5 367, GC 13443, HD 84441, HIP 47908, HR 3873, SAO 81004

Database references
SIMBAD	data

Epsilon Leonis (ε Leo, ε Leonis) is the fifth-brightest star in the constellation Leo, consistent with its Bayer designation Epsilon. It is known as Algenubi or Ras Elased Australis. Both names mean "the southern star of the lion's head". Australis is Latin for "southern" and Genubi is Arabic for "south".

== Properties ==
Epsilon Leonis has a stellar classification of G1 III, with the luminosity class of III indicating that, it has evolved into a giant star. It is currently on the red-giant branch stage of evolution and is much larger and brighter than the Sun, with a luminosity 282 times and a radius 21 times solar. Consequently, its absolute magnitude is actually –1.49, making it one of the more luminous stars in the constellation, significantly more than Regulus. Its apparent brightness, though, is only 2.98. Given its distance of about 247 light-years (76 parsecs), the star is more than three times the distance from the Sun than Regulus. At this distance, the visual magnitude of Epsilon Leonis is reduced by 0.03 as a result of extinction caused by intervening gas and dust.

Epsilon Leonis exhibits the characteristics of a Cepheid-like variable, changing by an amplitude of 0.3 magnitude every few days. It has around four times the mass of the Sun and a projected rotational velocity of 8.1 km s^{−1}. Based upon its iron abundance, the metallicity of this star's outer atmosphere is only around 52% of the Sun's. That is, the abundance of elements other than hydrogen and helium is about half that in the Sun.

== See also ==
- List of stars in Leo
- List of nearest supergiants
- Lists of stars
- Sun
- Class G Stars
- Variable star
- IAU designated constellations – Constellations recognized by the International Astronomical Union
