= Leo (constellation) =

Zodiac constellation straddling the celestial equator

- Constellation
- List of stars in Leo
- Abbreviation: Leo
- Genitive: Leonis
- Pronunciation: /ˈliːoʊ/, genitive /liːˈoʊnɪs/
- Symbolism: the Lion
- Right ascension: 11^{h}
- Declination: +15°
- Quadrant: NQ2
- Area: 947 sq. deg. (12th)
- Main stars: 9, 15
- Bayer/Flamsteed stars: 92
- Stars brighter than 3.00^{m}: 5
- Stars within 10.00 pc (32.62 ly): 5
- Brightest star: Regulus (α Leo) (1.35^{m})
- Nearest star: Wolf 359
- Messier objects: 5
- Meteor showers: Leonids
- Bordering constellations: Ursa Major; Leo Minor; Lynx (corner); Cancer; Hydra; Sextans; Crater; Virgo; Coma Berenices
- Visible at latitudes between +85° and −60°. Best visible at 21:00 (9 p.m.) during the month of April.

Leo /ˈliːoʊ/ is one of the constellations of the zodiac, between Cancer, the Crab, to the west and Virgo, the Maiden, to the east. It is located in the Northern celestial hemisphere. Its name is Latin for lion, and to the ancient Greeks represented the Nemean Lion killed by the mythical Greek hero Heracles as one of his twelve labors. Its traditional astronomical symbol is (♌︎). One of the 48 constellations described by the 2nd-century astronomer Ptolemy, Leo remains one of the 88 modern constellations today, and one of the most easily recognizable due to its many bright stars and a distinctive shape that is reminiscent of the crouching lion it depicts.

== Features ==
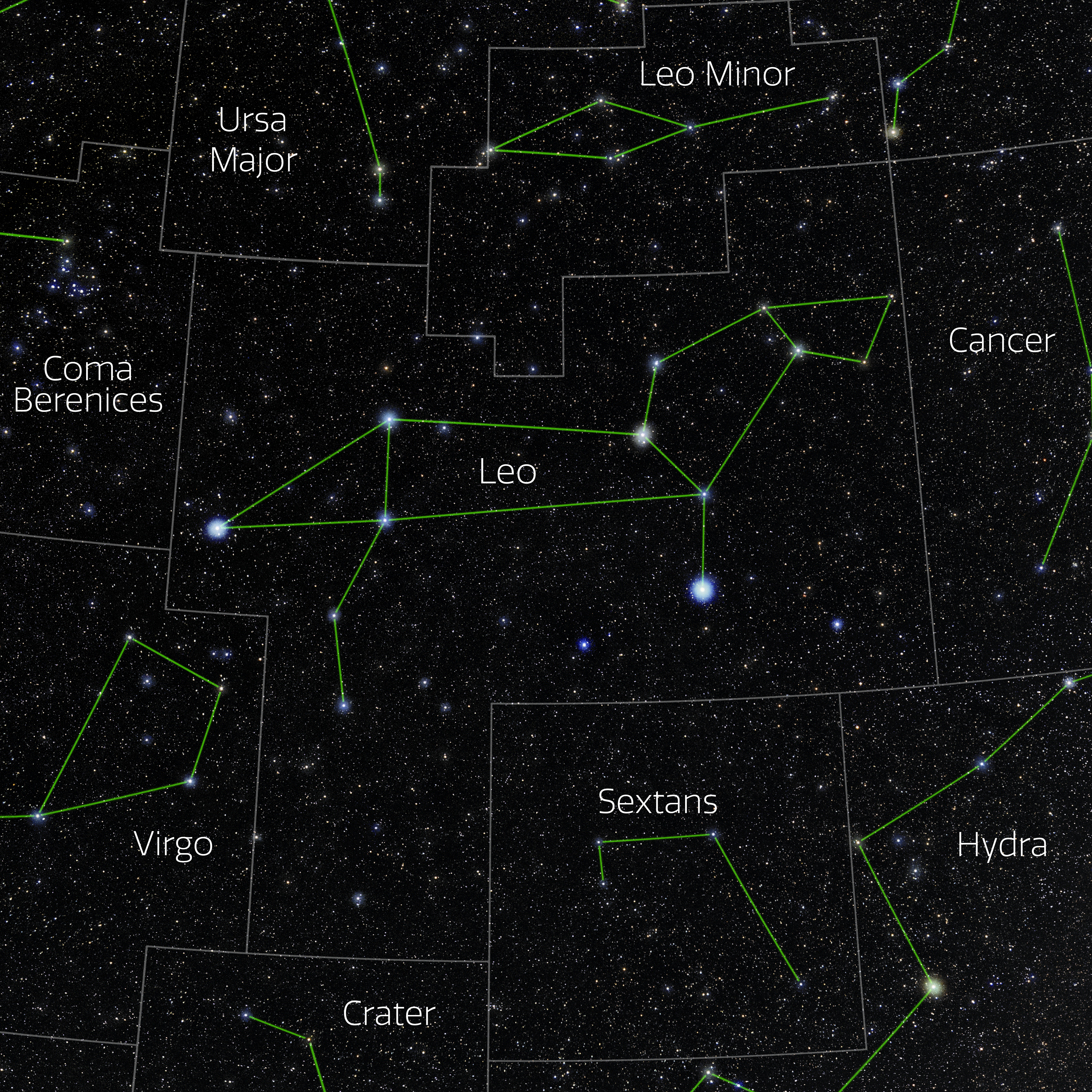
The constellation Leo showing the IAU boundaries, the constellation stick figure, and labels for its brightest stars

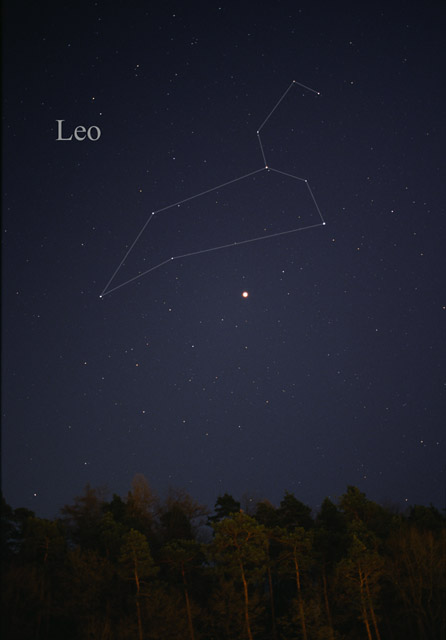
The constellation Leo as it can be seen by the naked eye (with Jupiter visible just below)

=== Stars ===
Leo contains many bright stars, many of which were individually identified by the ancients. There are nine bright stars that can be easily seen with the naked eye, four of the nine stars are either first or second magnitude which render this constellation especially prominent. Six of the nine stars also form an asterism known as "The Sickle," which to modern observers may resemble a backwards "question mark", The sickle is marked by six stars: Epsilon Leonis, Mu Leonis, Zeta Leonis, Gamma Leonis, Eta Leonis, and Alpha Leonis. The rest of the three stars form an isosceles triangle, Beta Leonis (Denebola) marks the lion's tail and the rest of his body is delineated by Delta Leonis and Theta Leonis.

- Alpha Leonis, called Regulus, is a blue-white main-sequence star of magnitude 1.34, 77.5 light-years from Earth. It is a double star divisible in binoculars, with a secondary of magnitude 7.7. Its traditional name (Regulus) means "the little king".
- Beta Leonis, also called Denebola, is at the opposite end of the constellation to Regulus. It is a blue-white star of magnitude 2.23, 36 light-years from Earth. The name Denebola means "the lion's tail".
- Gamma Leonis, also called Algieba, is a binary star with a third optical component; the primary and secondary are divisible in small telescopes and the tertiary is visible in binoculars. The primary is a gold-yellow giant star of magnitude 2.61 and the secondary is similar but at magnitude 3.6; they have a period of 600 years and are 126 light-years from Earth. The unrelated tertiary, 40 Leonis, is a yellow-tinged star of magnitude 4.8. Its traditional name, Algieba, means "the forehead".
- Delta Leonis, called Zosma, is a blue-white star of magnitude 2.58, 58 light-years from Earth.
- Mu Leonis, known as Rasalas, is a red star of magnitude of 3.88, which is bright enough to be seen with the naked eye. This system is 124 light-years from Earth. Rasalas is also known as Alshemali, with both names an abbreviation of "Al Ras al Asad al Shamaliyy", meaning "The Lion's Head Toward the South".
- Theta Leonis, called Chertan, is a white star of magnitude of 3.324 that is visible to the naked eye and forms one of the brighter stars in the constellation and is about 165 light-years from Earth. The name Chertan is derived from the Arabic al-kharātān 'two small ribs', and originally referred to Delta Leonis and Theta Leonis.

Brightest Stars of Leo
Proper Name	Bayer Designation	Light Years	Apparent Magnitude
Regulus	α Leonis	79	1.35
Denebola	β Leonis	36	2.14
Algieba	γ Leonis	130	2.08
Zosma	δ Leonis	58	2.56
Algenubi	ε Leonis	247	2.98
Adhafera	ζ Leonis	274	3.33
Al Jabhah	η Leonis	1,270	3.49
Chertan	θ Leonis	165	3.32
Rasalas	μ Leonis	124	3.88

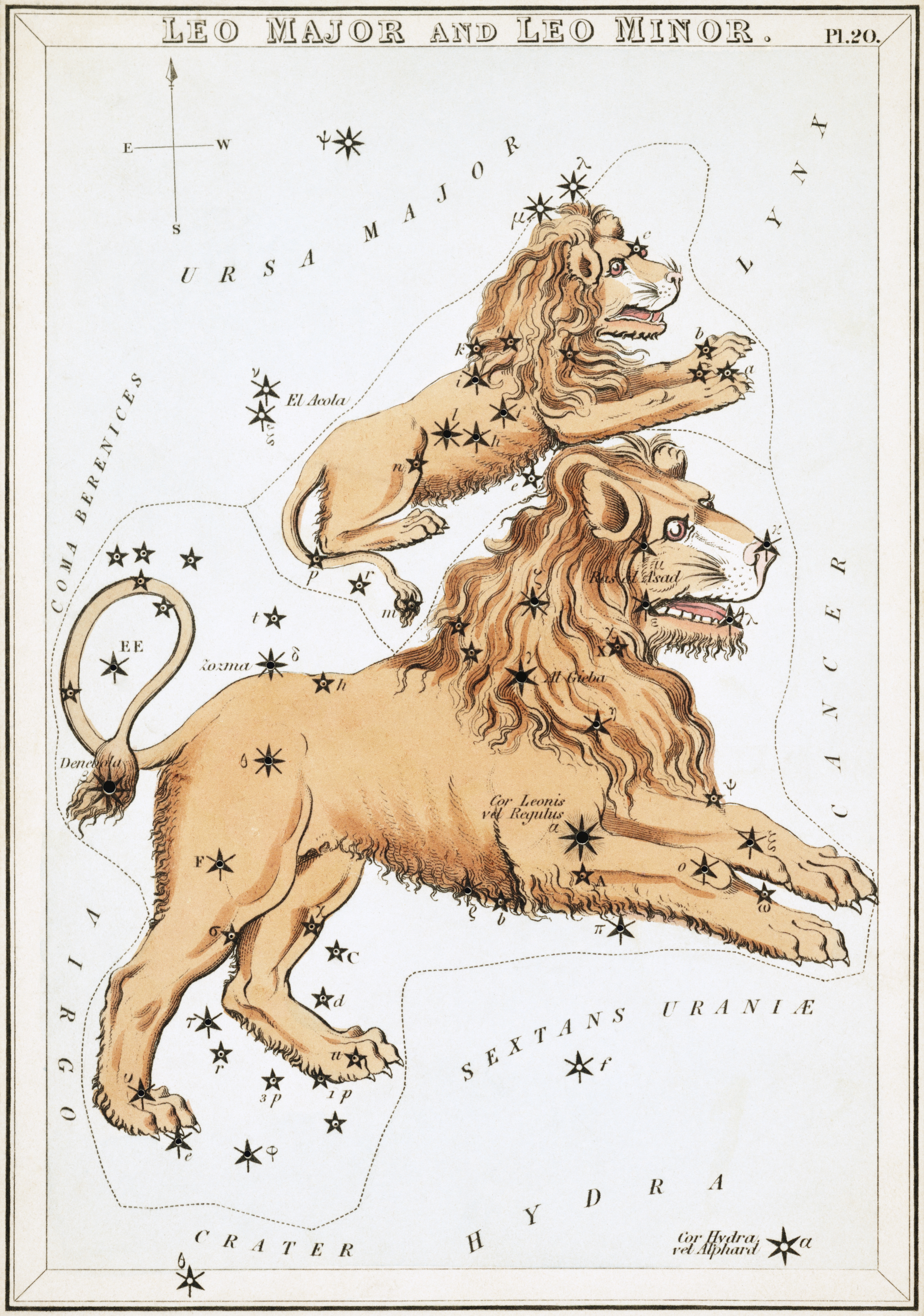
Leo, with Leo Minor above, as depicted in Urania's Mirror, a set of constellation cards published in London c.1825

Leo is also home to a bright variable star, the red giant R Leonis. It is a Mira variable with a minimum magnitude of 10 and normal maximum magnitude of 6; it periodically brightens to magnitude 4.4. R Leonis, 330 light-years from Earth, has a period of 310 days and a diameter of 450 solar diameters.

The star Wolf 359 (CN Leonis), one of the nearest stars to Earth at 7.8 light-years away, is in Leo. Wolf 359 is a red dwarf of magnitude 13.5; it periodically brightens by one magnitude or less because it is a flare star. Gliese 436, a faint star in Leo about 33 light-years away from the Sun, is orbited by a transiting Neptune-mass extrasolar planet.

The carbon star CW Leo (IRC +10216) is the brightest star in the night sky at the infrared N-band (10 μm wavelength).

The star SDSS J102915+172927 (Caffau's star) is a population II star in the galactic halo seen in Leo. It is about 13 billion years old, making it one of the oldest stars in the Galaxy. It has the lowest metallicity of any known star.

Modern astronomers, including Tycho Brahe in 1602, excised a group of stars that once made up the "tuft" of the lion's tail and used them to form the new constellation Coma Berenices (Berenice's hair), although there was precedent for that designation among the ancient Greeks and Romans.

=== Deep-sky objects ===
Leo contains many bright galaxies; Messier 65, Messier 66, Messier 95, Messier 96, Messier 105, and NGC 3628 are the most famous, the first two being part of the Leo Triplet.

The Leo Ring, a cloud of hydrogen, helium gas, is found in the orbit of two galaxies found within this constellation.

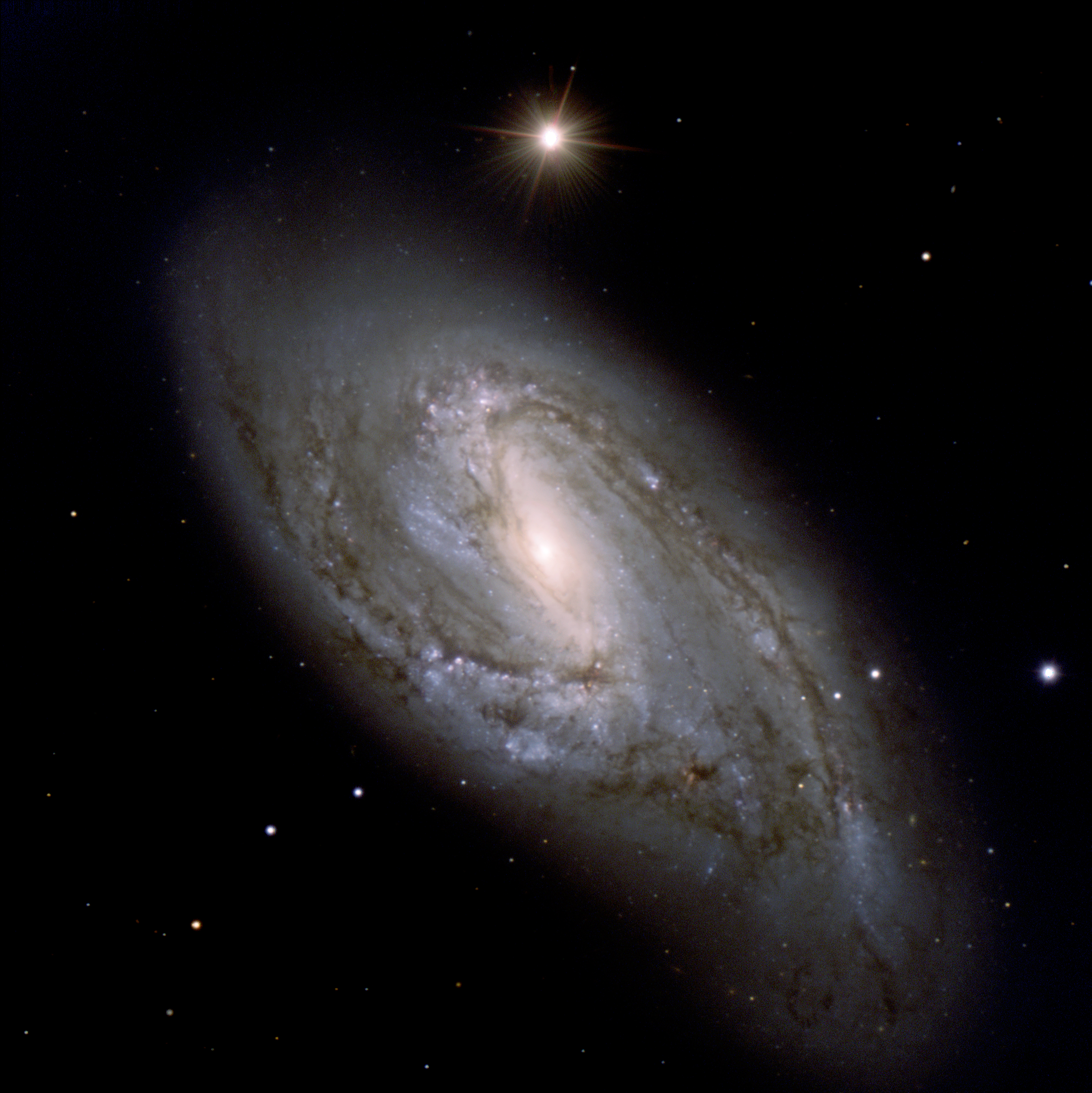
Messier 66

M66 is a spiral galaxy that is part of the Leo Triplet, whose other two members are M65 and NGC 3628. It is at a distance of 37 million light-years and has a somewhat distorted shape due to gravitational interactions with the other members of the Triplet, which are pulling stars away from M66. Eventually, the outermost stars may form a dwarf galaxy orbiting M66. Both M65 and M66 are visible in large binoculars or small telescopes, but their concentrated nuclei and elongation are only visible in large amateur instruments.

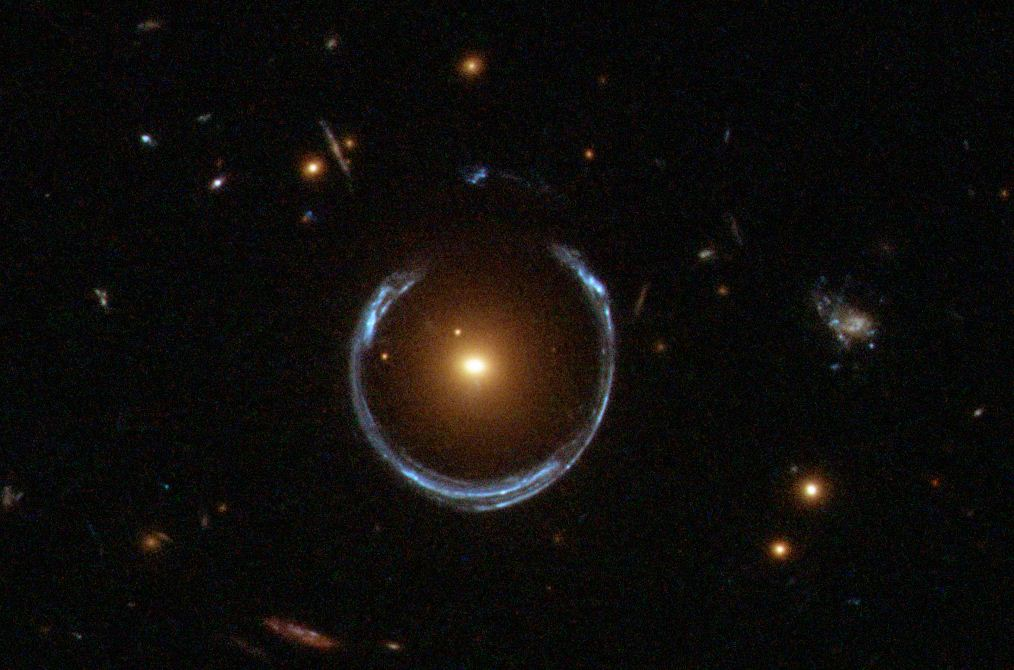
The notable gravitational lens known as the Cosmic Horseshoe

M95 and M96 are both spiral galaxies 20 million light-years from Earth. Though they are visible as fuzzy objects in small telescopes, their structure is only visible in larger instruments. M95 is a barred spiral galaxy. M105 is about a degree away from the M95/M96 pair; it is an elliptical galaxy of the 9th magnitude, also about 20 million light-years from Earth.

NGC 2903 is a barred spiral galaxy discovered by William Herschel in 1784. It is very similar in size and shape to the Milky Way and is located 25 million light-years from Earth. In its core, NGC 2903 has many "hotspots", which have been found to be near regions of star formation. The star formation in this region is thought to be due to the presence of the dusty bar, which sends shock waves through its rotation to an area with a diameter of 2,000 light-years. The outskirts of the galaxy have many young open clusters.

Leo is also home to some of the largest structures in the observable universe. Some of the structures found in the constellation are the Clowes–Campusano LQG, U1.11, U1.54, and the Huge-LQG, which are all large quasar groups; the latter being the second largest structure known (see also NQ2-NQ4 GRB overdensity).

=== Meteor showers ===
The Leonids occur in November, peaking on November 14–15, and have a radiant close to Gamma Leonis. Its parent body is Comet Tempel-Tuttle, which causes significant outbursts every 35 years. The normal peak rate is approximately 10 meteors per hour.

The January Leonids are a minor shower that peaks between January 1 and 7.

== History and mythology ==
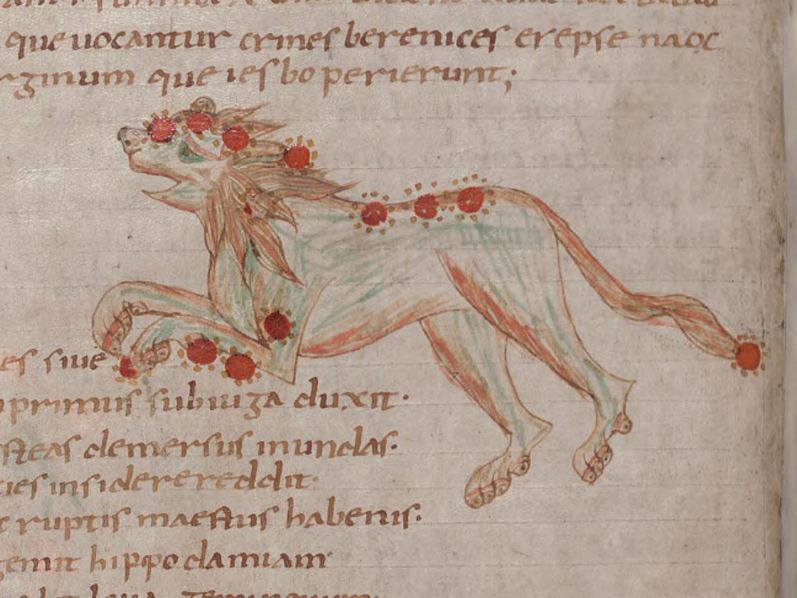
Leo from a western scientific manuscript, c.1000

Leo was one of the earliest recognized constellations, with archaeological evidence that the Mesopotamians had a similar constellation as early as 4000 BCE. The Persians called Leo Ser or Shir; the Turks, Artan; the Syrians, Aryo; the Jews, Arye; the Indians, Simha, all meaning "lion".

Cypriot stamp depicting a mosaical image of the encounter between Hercules and Leo, the Nemean Lion

Some mythologists believe that in Sumeria, Leo represented the monster Humbaba, who was killed by Gilgamesh.

In Babylonian astronomy, the constellation was called UR.GU.LA, the "Great Lion"; the bright star Regulus was known as "the star that stands at the Lion's breast." Regulus also had distinctly regal associations, as it was known as the King Star.

In Greek mythology, Leo was identified as the Nemean Lion which was killed by Heracles (Hercules to the Romans) during the first of his twelve labours. The Nemean Lion would take women as hostages to its lair in a cave, luring warriors from nearby towns to save the damsel in distress, to their misfortune. The Lion was impervious to any weaponry; thus, the warriors' clubs, swords, and spears were rendered useless against it. Realizing that he must defeat the Lion with his bare hands, Hercules slipped into the Lion's cave and engaged it at close quarters. When the Lion pounced, Hercules caught it in midair, one hand grasping the Lion's forelegs and the other its hind legs, and bent it backwards, breaking its back and freeing the trapped maidens. Zeus commemorated this labor by placing the Lion in the sky.

The Roman poet Ovid called it Herculeus Leo and Violentus Leo. Bacchi Sidus (star of Bacchus) was another of its titles, the god Bacchus always being identified with this animal. However, Manilius called it Jovis et Junonis Sidus (Star of Jupiter and Juno).

== Astrology ==
As of 2002, the Sun appears in the constellation Leo from August 10 to September 16. In tropical astrology, the Sun is considered to be in the sign Leo from July 23 to August 22, and in sidereal astrology, from August 16 to September 17.

== Namesakes ==
USS Leonis (AK-128) was a United States Navy Crater class cargo ship.

== See also ==
- Leo (Chinese astronomy)
