= Gamma Virginis =

Star in the constellation Virgo

γ Virginis
- Location of γ Virginis (circled)

Observation data Epoch J2000 Equinox ICRS
- Constellation: Virgo
- Right ascension: 12^{h} 41^{m} 39.64344^{s}
- Declination: −01° 26′ 57.7421″
- Apparent magnitude (V): 2.74 (3.650/3.560)‍

Characteristics
- Spectral type: F0 V/F0 V
- U−B color index: −0.05
- B−V color index: +0.36
- Variable type: Constant

Astrometry
Radial velocity (R_{v})	−19.5 km/s
Proper motion (μ)	RA: −614.76 mas/yr Dec.: 61.34 mas/yr
Parallax (π)	85.58±0.60 mas
Distance	38.1 ± 0.3 ly (11.68 ± 0.08 pc)
Absolute magnitude (M_{V})	2.41

Orbit
Period (P)	169.40±0.17 yr
Semi-major axis (a)	3.6142±0.0029″
Eccentricity (e)	0.88131±0.00012
Inclination (i)	150.148±0.070°
Longitude of the node (Ω)	214.76±0.12°
Periastron epoch (T)	2005.5192±0.0016
Argument of periastron (ω) (secondary)	74.50±0.12°

Details

A
Mass	1.429±0.032 M_{☉}
Radius	1.45 R_{☉}
Luminosity	4.27 L_{☉}
Surface gravity (log g)	4.27 cgs
Temperature	6,922±112 K
Metallicity [Fe/H]	−0.08±0.06 dex
Rotational velocity (v sin i)	29.7 km/s
Age	1.46+0.2 −0.18 Gyr

B
Mass	1.429±0.032 M_{☉}
Radius	1.45 R_{☉}
Luminosity	4.63+0.15 −0.14 L_{☉}
Surface gravity (log g)	4.49 cgs
Temperature	6,871±62 K
Metallicity [Fe/H]	−0.07 dex
Rotational velocity (v sin i)	23 km/s

Other designations
- Porrima, Antevorta, 29 Virginis, BD−00°2601, GCTP 2924.00, Gl 482 AB, HIP 61941, LHS 2604, SAO 138917, WDS 12417-0127
- γ Vir A: HD 110379, HR 4825, LFT 937, LTT 4843
- γ Vir B: HD 110380, HR 4826, LFT 937, LTT 4844

Database references
SIMBAD	γ Vir
- γ Vir A
- γ Vir B

Gamma Virginis (γ Virginis, abbreviated Gamma Vir, γ Vir), officially named Porrima /ˈpɒrɪmə/, is a binary star system in the constellation of Virgo. It consists of two almost identical main sequence stars at a distance of about 38 light-years.

== Name ==
γ Virginis (Latinised to Gamma Virginis) is the star's Bayer designation.

The traditional name Porrima derives from Ancient Rome: Porrima, also known as Antevorta, was one of the Camenae or goddesses of prophecy. In 2016, the International Astronomical Union organized a Working Group on Star Names (WGSN) to catalog and standardize proper names for stars. The WGSN's first bulletin of July 2016 included a table of the first two batches of names approved by the WGSN; which included Porrima for Gamma Virginis A.

In the catalogue of stars in the Calendarium of Al Achsasi Al Mouakket, this star was designated Laouiyet al Aoua, which was translated into Latin as Angulus Latratoris, meaning 'the angle of the barker'. This star, along with Beta Virginis (Zavijava), Eta Virginis (Zaniah), Delta Virginis (Minelauva) and Epsilon Virginis (Vindemiatrix), were Al ʽAwwāʼ, the Barker.

In Chinese, 太微左垣 (Tài Wēi Zuǒ Yuán), meaning Left Wall of Supreme Palace Enclosure, refers to an asterism consisting of Gamma Virginis, Eta Virginis, Delta Virginis, Epsilon Virginis and Alpha Comae Berenices. Consequently, the Chinese name for Gamma Virginis itself is 太微左垣二 (Tài Wēi Zuǒ Yuán èr, English: the Second Star of Left Wall of Supreme Palace Enclosure.), representing 東上相 (Dōngshǎngxiāng), meaning The First Eastern Minister. 東上相 (Dōngshǎngxiāng), westernized into Shang Seang by R. H. Allen and the meaning is "the High Minister of State".

== Properties ==
Gamma Virginis is a binary star, consisting of two stars of nearly equal apparent magnitudes 3.65 and 3.56, and of spectral type F0V. With an orbital period of 169 years, it was an easy object for amateur astronomers until the beginning of the 1990s, but in 2011 the smaller apparent distance between the stars requires a larger telescope or special techniques such as speckle interferometry, adaptive optics or optical interferometry to resolve the individual components. The last time they were at periapsis was in 1836. The distance became wide enough in 2020 to view with a small telescope. The star system has a combined apparent magnitude of 2.9. The system is 39 light-years away from the Sun.

Gamma Virginis has been reported to be slightly variable, but this is now considered unlikely.

At 2.8 degrees north of the ecliptic, Gamma Virginis can be occulted by the Moon and (rarely) by planets. In June 2011 Saturn passed a quarter of a degree south of Porrima.

Based upon X-ray emissions—an indicator of the strength of the stellar magnetic field—this system has an estimated age of 1.14 billion years.

== Changes of distance and position angle ==
This table shows the apparent distance between the two stars and their relative position angle: the first three columns show data predicted from an orbit calculated in 1937, the next two columns show in 2006, the next three columns show observations reported by the Hanwell Community Observatory.

Predicted from 1937 Strand orbit			Predicted from 2006 Docobo orbit		Observations 2003 to 2005		
Year	distance	position angle	distance	position angle	Date	distance	position angle
1995	2.5″	280	2.25″	277.6			
2000	1.8″	267	1.50″	260.9			
2002	1.5″	259	1.13″	247.5			
2003			0.92″	236.6	2003 Dec.	0.6″	219°
2004	1.2″	246	0.68″	218.4	2004 Dec.	0.4″	177°
2005			0.44″	179.8	2005 April	0.27–0.29″	161±0.6°
2006	0.8″	221	0.41″	103.5			
2008	0.4″	126	0.93″	41.0			
2010	0.9″	44	1.39″	23.6			
