= D Virginis =

d Virginis can refer to two different stars:

- d^{1} Virginis, 31 Virginis, HD 110423
- d^{2} Virginis, 32 Virginis, FM Virginis, HD 110951, HR 4847

== See also ==
- δ Virginis
