= Eta Virginis =

Binary star in the constellation Virgo

η Virginis (incl. Zaniah)
- Location of η Virginis (circled)

Observation data Epoch J2000 Equinox ICRS
- Constellation: Virgo
- Right ascension: 12^{h} 19^{m} 54.35783^{s}
- Declination: −00° 40′ 00.5095″
- Apparent magnitude (V): 3.890

Characteristics
- Spectral type: A2 V
- U−B color index: +0.055
- B−V color index: +0.029

Astrometry
Radial velocity (R_{v})	+2.3 km/s
Proper motion (μ)	RA: −57.58 mas/yr Dec.: −25.19 mas/yr
Parallax (π)	13.264±0.161 mas
Distance	246 ± 3 ly (75.4 ± 0.9 pc)
Absolute magnitude (M_{V})	−0.66

Orbit
Primary	η Vir Aa
Name	η Vir Ab
Period (P)	71.7916±0.0006 d
Semi-major axis (a)	0.00736±0.0006″
Eccentricity (e)	0.244±0.007
Inclination (i)	45.5±0.9°

Orbit
Primary	η Vir A
Name	η Vir B
Period (P)	7896.2±0.2 d
Semi-major axis (a)	0.133±0.001″
Eccentricity (e)	0.087±0.002
Inclination (i)	50.6±0.1°

Details

η Vir Aa
Mass	2.5039±0.1246 M_{☉}
Surface gravity (log g)	3.0 cgs
Temperature	9,333 K
Metallicity [Fe/H]	+0.11 dex
Rotational velocity (v sin i)	18 km/s

η Vir Ab
Mass	1.8907±0.0932 M_{☉}

η Vir B
Mass	1.66±0.16 M_{☉}

Other designations
- Zaniah, 15 Virginis, HR 4689, HD 107259, BD+00°2926, FK5 460, HIP 60129, SAO 138721, CCDM 12199-0040, WDS J12199-0040

Database references
SIMBAD	data

Eta Virginis (η Virginis, abbreviated Eta Vir, η Vir) is a triple star system in the zodiac constellation of Virgo. From parallax measurements, it is about 246 light-years (75 parsecs) from the Sun. It has a combined apparent visual magnitude of 3.89, bright enough to be seen with the naked eye in dark skies.

The system consists of a binary pair designated Eta Virginis A together with a third companion, Eta Virginis B. A's two components are themselves designated Eta Virginis Aa (officially named Zaniah /ˈzeɪniə/, the traditional name of the system) and Ab.

== Nomenclature ==
η Virginis (Latinised to Eta Virginis) is the system's Bayer designation. The designations of the two constituents as Eta Virginis A and those of A's components - Eta Virginis Aa and Ab - derive from the convention used by the Washington Multiplicity Catalog (WMC) for multiple star systems, and adopted by the International Astronomical Union (IAU).

It bore the traditional name Zaniah /zəˈnaɪ.ə/, derived from the Arabic زاوية zāwiyah "corner", the same source as Zavijava (Beta Virginis). In 2016, the IAU organized a Working Group on Star Names (WGSN) to catalogue and standardize proper names for stars. The WGSN decided to attribute proper names to individual stars rather than entire multiple systems. It approved the name Zaniah for the component Eta Virginis Aa on 12 September 2016 and it is now so included in the List of IAU-approved Star Names.

In the catalogue of stars in the Calendarium of Al Achsasi Al Mouakket, this star was designated Thanih al Aoua, which was translated into Latin as Secunda Latratoris, meaning "the second barker". This star, along with Beta Virginis (Zavijava), Gamma Virginis (Porrima), Delta Virginis (Minelauva) and Epsilon Virginis (Vindemiatrix), were Al ʽAwwāʼ, "the Barker".

In Chinese, 太微左垣 (Tài Wēi Zuǒ Yuán), meaning Left Wall of Supreme Palace Enclosure, refers to an asterism consisting of Eta Virginis, Gamma Virginis, Delta Virginis, Epsilon Virginis and Alpha Comae Berenices. Consequently, the Chinese name for Eta Virginis itself is 太微左垣一 (Tài Wēi Zuǒ Yuán yī, English: the First Star of Left Wall of Supreme Palace Enclosure.), representing 左執法 (Zuǒzhífǎ), meaning "The Left Law Administrator". 左執法 (Zuǒzhífǎ), spelled Tso Chih Fa by R.H. Allen, means "the Left-hand Maintainer of Law"

== Properties ==
Eta Virginis looks single, but lunar occultations have shown it to be a very close triple star system consisting of two stars 0.6 AU apart, assuming a distance of 91 parsecs, with a third slightly more distant star. The inner pair is a spectroscopic binary that completes an orbit in 72 days. The inclination of this orbit was determined through interferometer observations to be 45.5°, allowing the masses of the two stars to be estimated. The primary star, Eta Virginis Aa, has a mass about 2.5 times the Sun's mass, while the secondary, Eta Virginis Ab, has 1.9 solar masses. The faint tertiary star, Eta Virginis B, orbits the inner group in a wider orbit over a period of 13.1 years.

Eta Virginis is 1.97 degrees north of the ecliptic, so it can be occulted by the Moon and (rarely) by planets. On October 12, 272 BC the ancient Greek astronomer Timocharis observed a conjunction of the star with Venus. The last occultation by a planet took place on September 27, 1843, also by Venus, which will occult it again on September 30, 2078.

Two degrees north-following of Eta Virginis is SS Virginis, a typical cool carbon star and one of the most red-colored stars in the equatorial sky.
