= Coxa =

Coxa may refer to:

- Nickname of Brazilian association football team Coritiba Foot Ball Club
- Theta Leonis, a star
- Hip, below the lateral side of the abdomen
- Arthropod coxa, the short most-proximal base jointed segment of the arthropod leg
- An orthopaedic hospital in Tampere
  - Both meanings come from Latin coxa = "hip"
