= Gliese 504 b =

Exoplanet orbiting the star Gliese 504

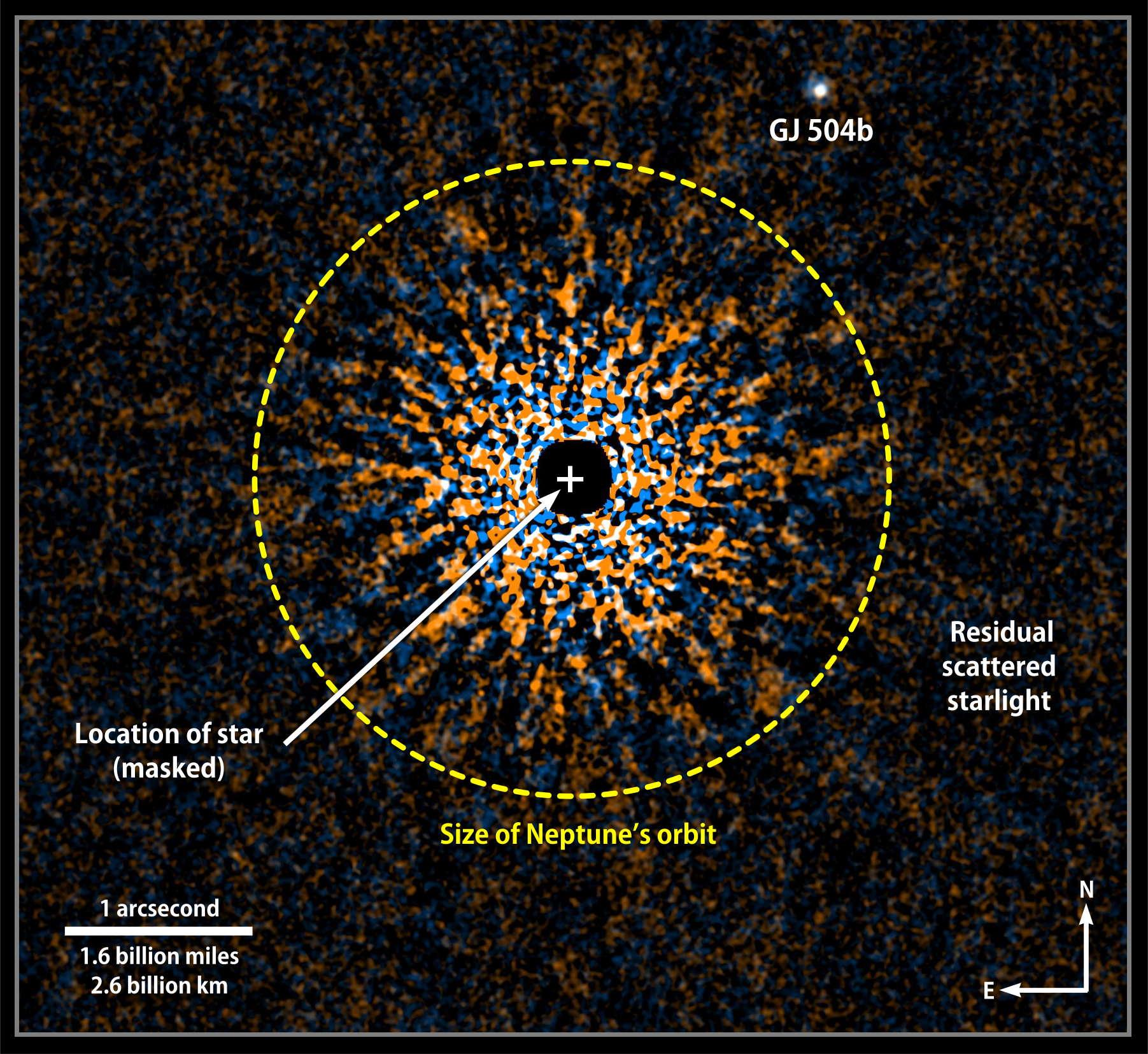
- Subaru images of GJ 504 using two near-infrared wavelengths (orange, 1.6 micrometers, taken in May 2011; blue, 1.2 micrometers, April 2012). Once processed to remove scattered starlight, the images reveal the orbiting planet, GJ 504b.

Discovery
- Discovered by: Kuzuhara et al.
- Discovery site: Subaru Telescope
- Discovery date: 2013
- Detection method: Direct imaging

Designations
- Alternative names: GJ 504 b, 59 Virginis b, e Virginis b, HD 115383 b, HIP 64792 b

Orbital characteristics
- Semi-major axis: 41.3+4.0 −10.0 AU
- Eccentricity: 0.22+0.11 −0.17
- Orbital period (sidereal): 242+37 −81 years
- Inclination: 141°+8.0° −8.7°
- Longitude of ascending node: 153.0+9.5 −12.0
- Time of periastron: 0.357+0.097 −0.078 (Note: Defined as fraction of orbital period after MJD=0.)
- Argument of periastron: 61°+37° −61°
- Star: 59 Virginis (Gliese 504)

Physical characteristics
- Mean radius: 0.92±0.02 R_{J} 0.96–0.97 R_{J}
- Mass: 25.2+8.4 −6.0 M_{J} 19–27 M_{J}
- Surface gravity: 4.87+0.13 −0.12 cgs
- Temperature: 564 ± 4 K (290.85 ± 4.00 °C; 555.53 ± 7.20 °F)
- Spectral type: T8

Gliese 504 b (or 59 Virginis b) is a jovian planet or a brown dwarf orbiting the solar analog 59 Virginis (Gliese 504), (Note: In spite of names of some exoplanets, derived from theirs host stars Flamsteed designations (for example, 51 Pegasi b, 61 Virginis b, 70 Virginis b etc.), the discoverers of this exoplanet did not use a similar name (i.e. "59 Virginis b") to refer to it, but used the designation "GJ 504 b" instead, derived from the Gliese–Jahreiß identifier of its parent star "GJ 504".) discovered by direct imaging using HiCIAO instrument and AO188 adaptive optics system on the Subaru Telescope of Mauna Kea Observatory, Hawaii by Kuzuhara et al.

== History of observation ==
The discovery images were taken in 2011 and common proper motion was confirmed in 2012 as part of the Strategic Explorations of Exoplanets and Disks with Subaru (SEEDS) survey. The SEEDS survey aims to detect and characterize giant planets and circumstellar disks using the 8.2-meter Subaru Telescope.

In February 2013 Kuzuhara et al. submitted the discovery paper to The Astrophysical Journal, and in September it was published. A follow-up study published in the October 2013 edition of the Astrophysical Journal confirmed methane absorption in the infrared H band, the first time this has been done for a directly imaged planet that formed within a disk.

In January 2025 Mâlin et al. published a paper confirming the detection of ammonia, using the Mid-Infrared Instrument aboard the James Webb Space Telescope.

In June 2026 Baburaj et al. published the first spectral observations of Gliese 504 b, made using the NIRSpec instrument aboard the James Webb Space Telescope, showing an unusual metal-rich atmosphere with salty clouds.

== Properties ==
GJ 504 b's spectral type was originally projected to be late T or early Y, and a follow-up study estimated that a T8 spectral type was the best fit. Comparing the spectrum and photometry of Gliese 504 b to atmospherical retrievals indicate an effective temperature is 564 ± 4 K (290.85 ± 4.00 °C; 555.53 ± 7.20 °F), much cooler than previously imaged exoplanets, and a radius of 0.92±0.02 R_{J}. Evolutionary models for an age of two billion years predict a radius between 0.96 and 0.97 R_{J}, indicating that the atmospheric radius may be underestimated.

The atmosphere has strong absorption by water, carbon monoxide, carbon dioxide, methane, ammonia, and hydrogen sulfide. The atmospheric retrievals also strongly prefer a cloudy atmosphere over a cloud-free atmosphere; the uppermost cloud layer is likely made of potassium chloride and zinc sulfide. Such retrievals also hint for an 2.5+0.9
−0.6 × overabundance of carbon and 2.1+1.0
−1.6 × overabundance of oxygen compared to the host star's abundances, which tentatively suggests planet-like formation but does not rule out brown dwarf-like formation, with more accurate measurements of both stellar and planetary abundances being necessary for more precise assertions.

The angular separation of the planet from its parent star is about 2.5 arcseconds, corresponding to a projected separation of 44.7 AU, which is nearly nine times the distance between Jupiter and the Sun, which poses a challenge to theoretical ideas of how giant planets form. Models such as core accretion or disk instability fail to reproduce the characteristics of this planet, such as its super-solar metallicity.

=== Mass ===
The mass of Gliese 504 b is uncertain, as it depends on the host star's age, which is poorly known. The discoverers adopted an age value 0.16+0.35
−0.06 Gyr and estimated mass as 4.0+4.5
−1.0 M_{J}. In 2015, other astronomers obtained age value 4.5+2.0
−1.5 Gyr, which corresponds to 20–30 M_{J}. In this case, the object is a brown dwarf rather than a planet.

In 2017, an intermediate age value 2.5+1.0
−0.7 Gyr was published, while in 2018 two ages of 21±2 Myr and 4±1.8 Gyr were published, corresponding to planetary masses of 1.3+0.6
−0.3 M_{J} and 23+10
−9 M_{J} respectively. Intermediate ages were proposed in 2025, ranging from 400 million to one billion years, which would imply a mass between one and 17 M_{J}, still not sufficient to confirm the nature of GJ 504 b. Measuring the abundance of ammonia in the planet's atmosphere could constrain its mass, current measurements suggest a mass likely within the planetary-mass regime, while the mid-infrared brightness seems to place the object at a higher age and mass. Indeed 59 Virginis appear to be older than a few million years, the properties which supported the very low age could also be explained by the engulfment of a planet. Ages between 360 million and 2.5 billion years were proposed in another 2025 study.

One 2026 study obtained a mass of 25.2+8.4
−6.0 M_{J} based on their retrieved surface gravity and radius from atmospheric retrievals, in good agreement with the 19–27 M_{J} derived from evolutionary models and earlier estimates derived for an age of 4.0±1.8 Gyr. Comparing the luminosity (10^{6.09±0.01} L_{☉}), temperature (564±4 K) and radius (0.92±0.04 R_{J}) with the predictions of ATMO evolutionary models would give an age between 2.5 and 4.0 billion years. The authors note that evolutionary models for low-temperature companions which account for a high metal enrichment, cloudy atmospheres and disequilibrium chemistry are necessary for more precise age determinations.
