= Iota Leonis =

Star in the constellation Leo

ι Leonis
- Location of ι Leonis (circled)

Observation data Epoch J2000 Equinox ICRS
- Constellation: Leo
- Right ascension: 11^{h} 23^{m} 55.45273^{s}
- Declination: +10° 31′ 46.2195″
- Apparent magnitude (V): 4.00

Characteristics
- Spectral type: F4 IV + F3 V + K4 V
- U−B color index: +1.420
- B−V color index: +0.456
- Variable type: Suspected

Astrometry
| Radial velocity (R_{v}) | −10.3 km/s |
| Proper motion (μ) | RA: +141.45 mas/yr Dec.: −79.14 mas/yr |
| Parallax (π) | 41.26±1.16 mas |
| Distance | 79 ± 2 ly (24.2 ± 0.7 pc) |
| Absolute magnitude (M_{V}) | +2.13 |

Orbit
| Primary | ι Leo A |
| Name | ι Leo B |
| Period (P) | 189.561+0.631 −0.814 yr |
| Semi-major axis (a) | 1.926+0.01 −0.009″ |
| Eccentricity (e) | 0.550±0.003 |
| Inclination (i) | 127.249+0.287 −0.412° |
| Longitude of the node (Ω) | 56.178+0.434 −0.449° |
| Periastron epoch (T) | 1948.86+0.193 −0.278 |
| Argument of periastron (ω) (secondary) | 145.345+0.561 −0.714° |

Details

ι Leo A
| Mass | 1.417+0.044 −0.081 M_{☉} |
| Radius | 2.93±0.10 R_{☉} |
| Luminosity | 11.5 L_{☉} |
| Surface gravity (log g) | 3.98 cgs |
| Temperature | 6,739 K |
| Metallicity [Fe/H] | 0.06 dex |
| Rotational velocity (v sin i) | 16 km/s |
| Age | 1.7±0.2 Gyr |

ι Leo B
| Mass | 1.183+0.163 −0.157 M_{☉} |

Other designations
- ι Leo, 78 Leo, BD+11°2348, GJ 426.1, GJ 9359, HD 99028, HIP 55642, HR 4399, SAO 99587

Database references
| SIMBAD | A |
- B

Iota Leonis, Latinized from ι Leonis, is a quadruple star system in the constellation Leo. The system is fairly close to the Sun, at only 79 light-years (24.2 parsecs) away, based on its parallax. The system has a combined apparent magnitude of 4.00 making it faintly visible to the naked eye. It is moving closer to the Sun with a radial velocity of −10 km/s.

The primary star, Iota Leonis A, has a spectral type of F3 IV, matching that of an F-type subgiant star. The second component in the star system is designated Iota Leonis B. It orbits the primary every 190 years, and with its perihelion passage in 1948, the separation between the two is steadily growing. The pair is also listed as a single-lined spectroscopic binary. It is a F-type main-sequence star with a mass 18.3% greater than that of the Sun.

The outer companion is designated StKM 2-732 and is also called Iota Leonis C. It has an angular separation from the inner pair by 331" along a position angle of 346°, and is itself a close binary. The combined spectrum is K6V.

== Name ==
In Chinese, 太微右垣 (Tài Wēi Yòu Yuán), meaning Right Wall of Supreme Palace Enclosure, refers to an asterism consisting of ι Leonis, β Virginis, σ Leonis, θ Leonis and δ Leonis. Consequently, the Chinese name for ι Leonis itself is 太微右垣三 (Tài Wēi Zuǒ Yuán sān, English: the Third Star of Right Wall of Supreme Palace Enclosure), representing 西次將 (Xīcìjiāng), meaning The Second Western General. 西次將 (Xīcìjiāng), spelled Tsze Tseang by R.H. Allen, means "the Second General".

== See also ==
- List of stars in Leo
- Chinese star names
