= Sigma Leonis =

Star in the constellation Leo

- Location of σ Leonis (circled in red)

Observation data Epoch J2000 Equinox ICRS
- Constellation: Leo
- Right ascension: 11^{h} 21^{m} 08.1943^{s}
- Declination: +06° 01′ 45.558″
- Apparent magnitude (V): 4.046

Characteristics
- Evolutionary stage: main sequence
- Spectral type: B9.5 Vs
- U−B color index: −0.12
- B−V color index: −0.06

Astrometry
Radial velocity (R_{v})	−5.3 km/s
Proper motion (μ)	RA: −91.76 mas/yr Dec.: −12.83 mas/yr
Parallax (π)	15.24±0.81 mas
Distance	210 ± 10 ly (66 ± 3 pc)
Absolute magnitude (M_{V})	−0.10

Details
Mass	2.76 M_{☉}
Radius	3.07±0.23 R_{☉}
Luminosity	133 L_{☉}
Surface gravity (log g)	3.83±0.03 cgs
Temperature	11,000±1,000 K
Metallicity [Fe/H]	+0.0 dex
Rotational velocity (v sin i)	70 km/s
Age	293 Myr

Other designations
- σ Leo, 77 Leo, BD+06°2437, FK5 427, HD 98664, HIP 55434, HR 4386, SAO 118804

Database references
SIMBAD	data

Sigma Leonis, Latinized from σ Leonis, is a blue-white hued star in the zodiac constellation Leo that is visible to the naked eye with an apparent visual magnitude of 4.0. Its annual parallax shift of 15.24 mas as seen from Earth implies a distance around 210 light years from the Sun. It is moving closer to the Sun with a radial velocity of –5 km/s.

Chini et al. (2012) list this as a single-lined spectroscopic binary system. The visible component has a stellar classification of B9.5 Vs, indicating it is a B-type main-sequence star. It is a suspected magnetic Ap star that shows an abundance anomaly with the element silicon. Sigma Leonis has an estimated 2.76 times the mass of the Sun and 3.07 times the Sun's radius. It is about 293 million years old with a projected rotational velocity of 70 km/s. The star is radiating 133 times the Sun's luminosity from its photosphere at an effective temperature of 11,000 K.

== Name ==
In Chinese, 太微右垣 (Tài Wēi Yòu Yuán), meaning Right Wall of Supreme Palace Enclosure, refers to an asterism consisting of σ Leonis, β Virginis, ι Leonis, θ Leonis and δ Leonis. Consequently, the Chinese name for σ Leonis itself is 太微右垣二 (Tài Wēi Yòu Yuán èr, English: the Second Star of Right Wall of Supreme Palace Enclosure.), representing 西上將 (Xīshǎngjiāng), meaning The First Western General. 西上將 (Xīshǎngjiāng), spelled Shang Tseang by R.H. Allen, means "the Higher General".
