= 59 Virginis =

Star in the constellation Virgo

- Location of 59 Virginis (circled in red)

Observation data Epoch J2000 Equinox ICRS
- Constellation: Virgo
- Right ascension: 13^{h} 16^{m} 46.51486^{s}
- Declination: +09° 25′ 26.9601″
- Apparent magnitude (V): 5.22

Characteristics
- Evolutionary stage: main-sequence
- Spectral type: G0V
- Apparent magnitude (B): 5.81
- Apparent magnitude (V): 5.22
- Apparent magnitude (R): 4.8
- Apparent magnitude (J): 4.39±0.28
- Apparent magnitude (H): 4.107±0.208
- Apparent magnitude (K): 4.033±0.238

Astrometry
Radial velocity (R_{v})	−27.25±0.13 km/s
Proper motion (μ)	RA: −335.473 mas/yr Dec.: +191.038 mas/yr
Parallax (π)	56.8577±0.1224 mas
Distance	57.4 ± 0.1 ly (17.59 ± 0.04 pc)
Absolute magnitude (M_{V})	4.08±0.010

Details
Mass	1.29±0.21 M_{☉}
Radius	1.227±0.012 R_{☉}
Luminosity (bolometric)	2.01±0.03 L_{☉}
Surface gravity (log g)	4.29±0.07 cgs
Temperature	6205±20 K
Metallicity [Fe/H]	0.22±0.04 dex
Rotation	3.329 days
Rotational velocity (v sin i)	5.47^{+0.12}_{−0.17} km/s
Age	2.11±1.75 Gyr

Other designations
- e Vir, 59 Vir, BD+10 2531, GJ 504, HD 115383, HIP 64792, HR 5011, SAO 119847, WDS J13168+0925A, LTT 13852

Database references
SIMBAD	data
Exoplanet Archive	data
ARICNS	data

59 Virginis (e Virginis, HR 5011, Gliese 504) is a G-type main-sequence star, located in the constellation Virgo at approximately 57 light-years from Earth. It has a planetary or brown dwarf companion designated Gliese 504 b.

== History of observations ==
59 Virginis is known to astronomers at least from 1598, when it was catalogued by Tycho Brahe in his manuscript catalogue of 1004 fixed stars. Brahe designated it as "Parvula sequens vindemiatricem", which means in Latin "A tiny following Vindemiatrix" (that is Epsilon Virginis), and assigned it a visual magnitude 6 (a modern value of its apparent magnitude (in band V) is 5.22). Five years later in 1603 Johann Bayer pictured it on constellation Virgo folio of his celestial atlas "Uranometria" and designated it with number 37, letter "e" (hence its Bayer designation e Virginis, or e Vir) and name "Alæ dextræ sequens", which means in Latin "Following right wing". Bayer also assigned it a visual magnitude 6.

In July 2013, Kuzuhara et al. announced the discovery of planet b orbiting this star. The discovery was made using the 8.2-meter Subaru Telescope of Mauna Kea Observatory, Hawaii.

== Age and other characteristics ==
The star is a relatively old Sun-like star with a spectral type of G0V and an effective temperature 6205±20 K (not much hotter than the Sun). It is twice as bright as the Sun in terms of luminosity. 59 Virginis appeared to be a subgiant star that has recently evolved off the main sequence stage, as its luminosity and temperature places it in the main-sequence turnoff in the Hertzsprung–Russell diagram, but was later found to be on the main sequence. It has a rotation period of 3.329 days. The star exhibits a Sun-like magnetic reversal cycle with the period about 12 years.

59 Virginis has an unusually high stellar rotation velocity and stellar activity, which led some astronomers to believe that it could be a young star several million years old. However, spectroscopy of the star's substellar companion, GJ 504 b, has suggested an age in the range of 3–6 billion years. Various studies have estimated different ages for 59 Virginis: 0.16^{+0.35}_{−0.60} Gyr (2013), 4.5^{+2.0}_{−1.5} Gyr (2015), 2.5^{+1.0}_{−0.7} Gyr (2017), 4.0±1.8 Gyr (2018) and 2.11±1.75 Gyr (2025). 2015 and 2017 studies led by Fuhrmann & Chini and D'Orazi et al. hypothesized that 59 Virginis's high activity and rotation may have been caused by the engulfment of a hot Jupiter. This was supported by, among other studies, a 2026 publication, which found that only a scenario of planet engulfment can explain the star's fast rotation, X-ray luminosity, and angular momentum.

== Substellar companion ==
In 2013, the discovery of a Jovian planet, Gliese 504 b (59 Virginis b), by direct imaging of the system was announced. It was initially estimated to be about 4 times the mass of Jupiter, based on an young age for the host star. Later studies found an older age and suggested a larger mass for the companion; since it exceeds the mass for deuterium fusion, it may be considered a brown dwarf. A 2026 study with the James Webb Space Telescope found a mass about 25 times that of Jupiter, implying an age of 2.5–4 billion years. The body's elemental abundances suggest planet-like formation, but do not rule out star-like formation.

The 59 Virginis planetary system
Companion (in order from star)	Mass	Semimajor axis (AU)	Orbital period (years)	Eccentricity	Inclination (°)	Radius
b	25.2+8.4 −6.0 M_{J}	41.3+4.0 −10	242+37 −84	0.22+0.11 −0.17	141+8.0 −8.7	0.92±0.02 R_{J}
