= Alpha Comae Berenices =

Star in the constellation Coma Berenices

- Location of α Comae Berenices (circled)

Observation data Epoch J2000 Equinox ICRS
- Constellation: Coma Berenices
- Right ascension: 13^{h} 09^{m} 59.285^{s}
- Declination: +17° 31′ 46.04″
- Apparent magnitude (V): 4.29 to 4.35 (combined); A: 4.85 / B: 5.53

Characteristics
- Spectral type: A: F5V / B: F5V (binary star)
- U−B color index: −0.06
- B−V color index: 0.45
- V−R color index: 0.2
- R−I color index: 0.2

Astrometry
Radial velocity (R_{v})	−17.7±0.9 km/s
Proper motion (μ)	RA: −433.13±0.70 mas/yr Dec.: 141.24±0.51 mas/yr
Parallax (π)	56.10±0.89 mas
Distance	58.1 ± 0.9 ly (17.8 ± 0.3 pc)
Absolute magnitude (M_{V})	3.82

Orbit
Period (P)	25.8696±0.008219 yr
Semi-major axis (a)	0.67144±0.00033″
Eccentricity (e)	0.51060±0.00061
Inclination (i)	90.0501±0.0062°
Longitude of the node (Ω)	12.2272±0.0098°
Periastron epoch (T)	57056.84±0.36
Argument of periastron (ω) (secondary)	100.563±0.026°

Details

A
Mass	1.237 M_{☉}
Luminosity	1.72 L_{☉}
Surface gravity (log g)	4.19 cgs
Temperature	6,365 K
Metallicity [Fe/H]	−0.23 dex

B
Mass	1.087 M_{☉}
Luminosity	1.75 L_{☉}
Temperature	6,378 K

Other designations
- Diadem, α Com, 42 Com, BD+18 2697, GC 17833, GJ 501, HIP 64241, SAO 100443, PPM 129630, ADS 8804, CCDM J13100+1732, WDS J13100+1732, LTT 13802, NLTT 33105, STF 1728, IDS 13051+1803 AB
- A: HD 114378, HR 4968
- B: HD 114379, HR 4969

Database references
SIMBAD	The system
- A
- B

Alpha Comae Berenices is a binary star system in the northern constellation of Coma Berenices (Berenice's Hair). Its name is a Bayer designation, which is Latinized from α Comae Berenices. With a combined apparent visual magnitude that varies 4.29 to 4.35, it is faintly visible to the naked eye. Based on parallax measurements, it is located at a distance of 58 light-years (17.8 pc) from the Earth.

This system consists of two main sequence stars, each a little hotter and more luminous than the Sun. The two components are designated Alpha Comae Berenices A and B. Component A is officially named Diadem /ˈdaɪədɛm/, the traditional name for the system.

== Nomenclature ==
α Comae Berenices (Latinised to Alpha Comae Berenices) is the system's Bayer designation, abbreviated Alpha Com or α Com. The designations of the two components as Alpha Comae Berenices A and B derive from the convention used by the Washington Multiplicity Catalog (WMC) for multiple star systems, and adopted by the International Astronomical Union (IAU). Alpha Comae Berenices is said to represent the crown worn by Queen Berenice.

The system has the proper name Diadem, of unknown modern origin. In 2016, the International Astronomical Union organized a Working Group on Star Names (WGSN) to catalogue and standardize proper names for stars. The WGSN decided to attribute proper names to individual stars rather than entire multiple systems. It approved the name Diadem for the component Alpha Comae Berenices A on 1 February 2017 and it is now so included in the List of IAU-approved Star Names.

In Chinese, 太微左垣 (Tài Wēi Zuǒ Yuán), meaning Left Wall of Supreme Palace Enclosure, refers to an asterism consisting of Alpha Comae Berenices, Eta Virginis, Gamma Virginis, Delta Virginis and Epsilon Virginis. Consequently, the Chinese name for Alpha Comae Berenices itself is 太微左垣五 (Tài Wēi Zuǒ Yuán wǔ, English: the Fifth Star of Left Wall of Supreme Palace Enclosure), representing 東上將 (Dōngshǎngjiāng), meaning The First Eastern General. 東上將 (Dōngshǎngjiāng), westernized into Shang Tseang, but that name was designated for "v Comae Berenices" by R.H. Allen and the meaning is "a Higher General".

== Properties ==
Although Alpha Comae Berenices bears the title "alpha", at magnitude 4.32 it is actually fainter than Beta Comae Berenices.

This is a binary star, with almost equal components of magnitudes 5.05 m and 5.08 m orbiting each other with a period of 25.87 years. The system, estimated to be 58 light-years distant, is aligned nearly "edge-on" from the Earth so that the two stars appear to move back-and-forth in a straight line with a maximum separation of only 0.7 arcsec. The mean physical separation between them is approximately 10 AU, about the distance between the Sun and Saturn.

Eclipses are predicted to occur between the two components, however they have not been successfully observed due to miscalculations of the time of eclipse. If eclipses do occur, the next primary eclipse is expected to be around 27 September 2040; the most recent date for a secondary eclipse, which had only a 3.3% probability of happening, was 11 January 2026.

The binary star has a visual companion, CCDM J13100+1732C, of apparent magnitude 10.2, located 89 arcseconds away along a position angle of 345°.

Alpha Comae Berenicis forms an isosceles triangle with globular star clusters Messier 53 and NGC 5053. The apparent diameter of this triangle is a little more than one degree. The location of Alpha Comae Berenicis is westward (preceding) of both globular star clusters.
