= Delta Leonis =

Binary star system in the constellation Leo

δ Leonis
- Location of δ Leonis (circled)

Observation data Epoch J2000 Equinox ICRS
- Constellation: Leo
- Right ascension: 11^{h} 14^{m} 06.50142^{s}
- Declination: +20° 31′ 25.3853″
- Apparent magnitude (V): 2.56

Characteristics
- Evolutionary stage: main sequence
- Spectral type: A4 V
- U−B color index: +0.12
- B−V color index: +0.12

Astrometry
Radial velocity (R_{v})	−20.2 km/s
Proper motion (μ)	RA: +143.42 mas/yr Dec.: −129.88 mas/yr
Parallax (π)	55.82±0.25 mas
Distance	58.4 ± 0.3 ly (17.91 ± 0.08 pc)
Absolute magnitude (M_{V})	+1.29

Details
Mass	2.2 M_{☉}
Radius	2.14 ± 0.040 R_{☉}
Luminosity	15.5 ± 1.8 L_{☉}
Surface gravity (log g)	3.91 cgs
Temperature	8,296 K
Rotational velocity (v sin i)	180 km/s
Age	0.60–0.75 Gyr

Other designations
- Zosma, Duhr, Zubra, δ Leo, 68 Leo, BD+21°2298, FK5 422, GC 15438, GJ 419, HD 97603, HIP 54872, HR 4357, SAO 81727, PLX 2614.00

Database references
SIMBAD	data

Delta Leonis (δ Leonis), also named Zosma /ˈzɒzmə/, is a star in the zodiac constellation of Leo. Based upon parallax measurements, it lies at a distance of about 58.4 light-years (17.9 parsecs) from the Sun.

== Properties ==
δ Leonis is a main-sequence star with a stellar classification of A4 V, meaning it is larger and hotter than the Sun. It is a fairly well-studied star, allowing relatively accurate measurements of its age and size. The radius of the star, as measured directly using an interferometer, is about 214% of the Sun's radius and it is emitting more than 15 times as much luminosity as the Sun. The energy is being emitted from the outer envelope with an effective temperature 8,296 K, giving it the white hue characteristic of an A-type star. Having a larger mass than the Sun it will have a shorter lifespan, and in another 600 million years or so will swell into an orange or red giant star before decaying quietly into a remnant white dwarf consisting of carbon and oxygen.

This star is rotating rapidly, with a projected rotational velocity of 180 km s^{−1}. The inclination of the axis of rotation to the line of sight from the Earth is estimated at 38.1°, which would mean the azimuthal velocity along the equator is about 280 km s^{−1}. This rotation is producing an equatorial bulge, giving the star a pronounced oblate spheroidal shape. The polar radius is about 84% of the radius along the equator.

Based upon the location and trajectory of this star through space, it may be a member of the Ursa Major Moving Group, a type of stellar kinematics group that share a common origin and motion through space. The age of this group is about 500 million years.

== Nomenclature ==
δ Leonis (Latinised to Delta Leonis, abbreviated Delta Leo, δ Leo) is the star's Bayer designation.

It bore the traditional names Zosma (or Zozma) from ancient Greek ζῶσμα 'girdle', apparently a misreading of ὀσφῦς 'hip' or 'lower back', and Duhr (or Dhur) from Arabic ẓahr (ظهر) 'back [of the lion]'. With θ Leonis (Chertan), it formed the Arabic lunar station Al-Zubra الزبرة 'the lion's mane'. In 2016, the International Astronomical Union organized a Working Group on Star Names (WGSN) to catalog and standardize proper names for stars. The WGSN's first bulletin of July 2016 included a table of the first two batches of names approved by the WGSN, which included Zosma for this star.

In Chinese, 太微右垣 (Tài Wēi Yòu Yuán), meaning Right Wall of Supreme Palace Enclosure, refers to an asterism consisting of δ Leonis, β Virginis, σ Leonis, ι Leonis and θ Leonis. Consequently, the Chinese name for δ Leonis itself is 太微右垣五 (Tài Wēi Zuǒ Yuán wu, English: the Fifth Star of Right Wall of Supreme Palace Enclosure), representing 西上相 (Xīshǎngxiāng), meaning The First Western Minister. 西上相 (Xīshǎngxiāng), spelled Shang Seang by R.H. Allen, means "the Higher Minister of State".
