= Delta Virginis =

Star in the constellation Virgo

δ Virginis (Minelauva)
- Location of δ Virginis (circled)

Observation data Epoch J2000 Equinox ICRS
- Constellation: Virgo
- Right ascension: 12^{h} 55^{m} 36.20861^{s}
- Declination: +3° 23′ 50.8932″
- Apparent magnitude (V): 3.32 - 3.40

Characteristics
- Evolutionary stage: AGB
- Spectral type: M3+ III
- U−B color index: +1.825
- B−V color index: +1.565
- Variable type: Semiregular

Astrometry
Radial velocity (R_{v})	−18.14±0.55 km/s
Proper motion (μ)	RA: −469.99 mas/yr Dec.: −52.83 mas/yr
Parallax (π)	16.44±0.22 mas
Distance	198 ± 3 ly (60.8 ± 0.8 pc)
Absolute bolometric magnitude (M_{bol})	−2.4±0.3

Details
Mass	1.19±0.2 M_{☉}
Radius	67.4±1 R_{☉}
Luminosity	697 L_{☉}
Surface gravity (log g)	0.8 cgs
Temperature	3,643 K
Metallicity [Fe/H]	−0.06 dex
Rotational velocity (v sin i)	8.1 km/s

Other designations
- Minelauva, 43 Virginis, BD+04°2669, FK5 484, HD 112300, HIP 63090, HR 4910, LTT 13714, SAO 119674, WDS 12556+0324

Database references
SIMBAD	data

Delta Virginis (δ Virginis, abbreviated Del Vir, δ Vir), formally named Minelauva /ˌmɪnəˈlɔːvə/, is a star in the zodiac constellation of Virgo. With an apparent visual magnitude of 3.4, this star is bright enough to be seen with the naked eye. It is located at a distance of about 200 light-years (61 parsecs) from Earth.

== Nomenclature ==
δ Virginis (Latinised to Delta Virginis) is the star's Bayer designation.

It bore the traditional, medieval names Auva and Minelauva from the Arabic من العواء min al-ʽawwāʼ, meaning "in the lunar mansion of ʽawwaʼ" (a name of unknown meaning). In 2016, the IAU organized a Working Group on Star Names (WGSN) to catalog and standardize proper names for stars. The WGSN approved the name Minelauva for this star on 30 June 2017 and it is now so included in the List of IAU-approved Star Names.

This star, along with Beta Virginis (Zavijava), Gamma Virginis (Porrima), Eta Virginis (Zaniah) and Epsilon Virginis (Vindemiatrix), were Al ʽAwwāʼ, 'the Barker'.

In Chinese, 太微左垣 (Tài Wēi Zuǒ Yuán), meaning Left Wall of Supreme Palace Enclosure, refers to an asterism consisting of Delta Virginis, Eta Virginis, Gamma Virginis, Epsilon Virginis and Alpha Comae Berenices. Consequently, the Chinese name for Delta Virginis itself is 太微左垣三 (Tài Wēi Zuǒ Yuán sān, English: the Third Star of Left Wall of Supreme Palace Enclosure), representing 東次相 (Dōngcìxiāng), meaning 'The Second Eastern Minister'. 東次相 (Dōngcìxiāng), westernized into Tsze Seang by R.H. Allen and meaning "the Second Minister of State".

== Properties ==
The spectrum of Delta Virginis matches a stellar classification of M3 III, which places it among the category of evolved stars called red giants. Indeed, the outer atmosphere of this star has expanded to around 67 times the radius of the Sun. Even though it has just 1.19 times the mass of the Sun, this wide envelope gives it a luminosity of nearly 700 times the Sun's. This energy is being radiated from a relatively cool outer atmosphere that has an effective temperature of 3,643 K. It is this cool temperature that gives it the orange-red glow of an M-type star.

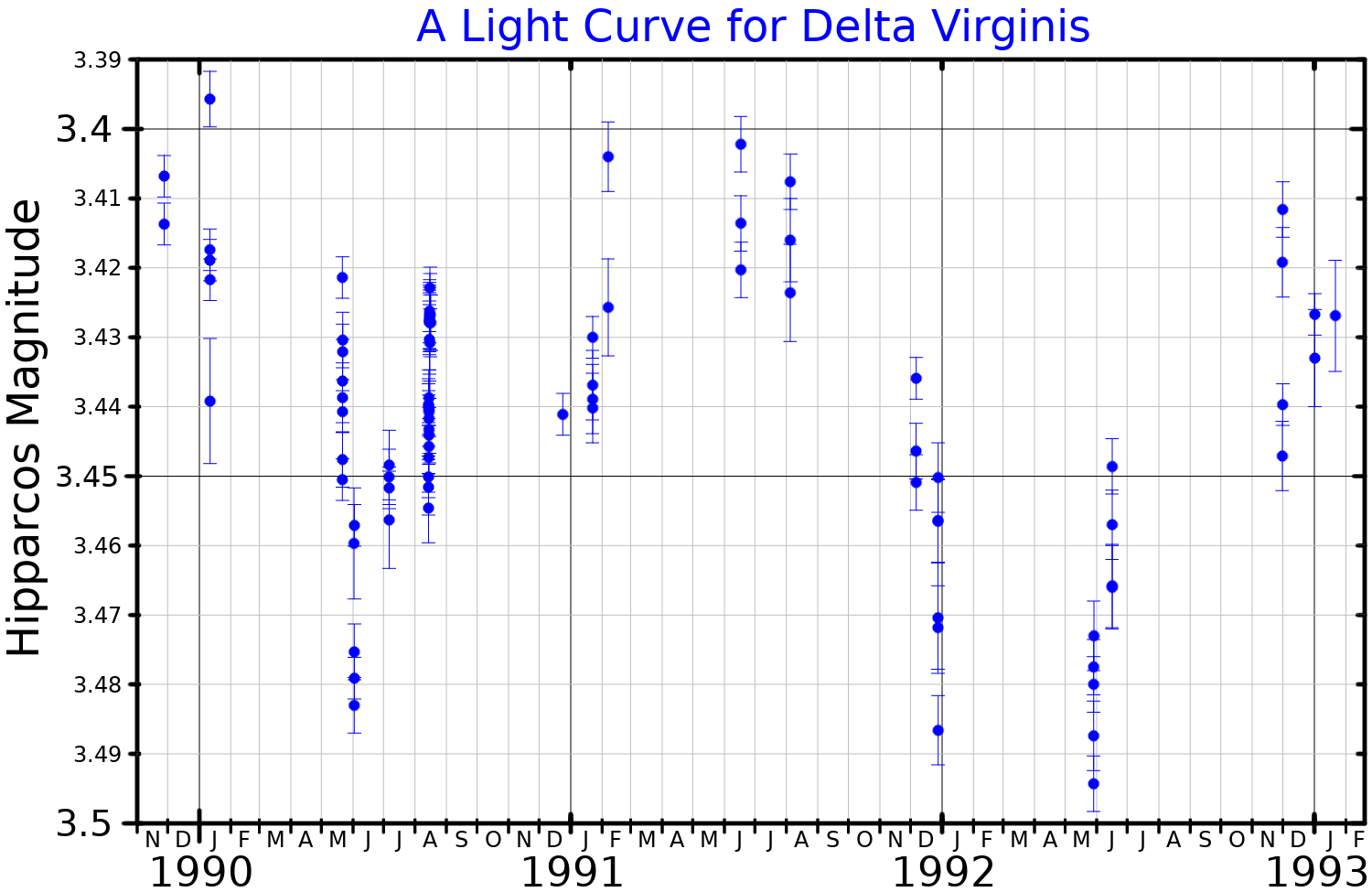
A light curve for Delta Virginis, plotted from Hipparcos data

The outer envelope of this star is undergoing a type of pulsation that occurs in a class of variable stars known as semiregular variables and its brightness varies from magnitude +3.32 to +3.40. Based upon frequency analysis of the observed light curve, the star's variability exhibits multiple periods of pulsation. The detected periods are 13.0, 17.2, 25.6, 110.1 and 125.8 days. This is a high-velocity star with a peculiar velocity of more than 30 km s^{−1} relative to the mean motion of other stars in the vicinity.

Delta Virginis is a possible binary star, as an 11th magnitude star is located at an angular separation of 80 arcseconds. This K-type dwarf may have an orbital period of over 200,000 years, but this has not been confirmed.

== Planetary system ==
A 2023 study detected radial velocity variations in Delta Virginis (HD 112300), showing evidence of a exoplanet.

The Delta Virginis planetary system
Companion (in order from star)	Mass	Semimajor axis (AU)	Orbital period (days)	Eccentricity	Inclination (°)	Radius
b	≥15.83+2.33 −2.74 M_{J}	1.33+0.08 −0.11	466.63+1.47 −1.28	0.36+0.06 −0.11	—	—
