= 61 Virginis c =

Massive exoplanet

Discovery
- Discovered by: Vogt et al.
- Discovery site: Keck Observatory; Anglo-Australian Observatory
- Discovery date: 2009-12-14
- Detection method: Radial velocity

Orbital characteristics
- Apastron: 0.2487 AU (37,200,000 km)
- Periastron: 0.1863 AU (27,870,000 km)
- Semi-major axis: 0.2175±0.0001 AU
- Eccentricity: 0.14±0.06
- Orbital period (sidereal): 38.021±0.034 d 0.10409 y
- Average orbital speed: 62.45
- Time of periastron: 2453369.166
- Argument of periastron: 341±38
- Star: 61 Virginis

61 Virginis c (abbreviated 61 Vir c) is an exoplanet orbiting the 5th apparent-magnitude G-type main-sequence star 61 Virginis in the constellation Virgo. 61 Virginis c has a minimum mass of 18.2 times that of Earth and orbits one-fifth the distance to the star as Earth orbits the Sun, at a precise distance of 0.2175 AU with an eccentricity of 0.14. This planet would most likely be a gas giant like Uranus and Neptune. This planet was discovered on 14 December 2009 from using a precise radial velocity method taken at Keck and Anglo-Australian Observatories.

61 Virginis System

== See also ==
- List of star systems within 25–30 light-years
