= 61 Virginis =

Star in the constellation Virgo

- Location of 61 Virginis (circled)

Observation data Epoch J2000 Equinox ICRS
- Constellation: Virgo
- Right ascension: 13^{h} 18^{m} 24.31399^{s}
- Declination: −18° 18′ 40.2977″
- Apparent magnitude (V): 4.74

Characteristics
- Evolutionary stage: main sequence
- Spectral type: G7V
- Apparent magnitude (B): 5.45
- Apparent magnitude (J): 3.334
- Apparent magnitude (H): 2.974
- Apparent magnitude (K): 2.956
- U−B color index: 0.26
- B−V color index: 0.71
- V−R color index: 0.37
- R−I color index: 0.33

Astrometry
Radial velocity (R_{v})	−7.86±0.13 km/s
Proper motion (μ)	RA: −1,070.202 mas/yr Dec.: −1,063.849 mas/yr
Parallax (π)	117.1726±0.1456 mas
Distance	27.84 ± 0.03 ly (8.53 ± 0.01 pc)
Absolute magnitude (M_{V})	5.07

Details
Mass	0.93±0.01 M_{☉}
Radius	0.9867±0.0048 R_{☉}
Luminosity	0.8222±0.0033 L_{☉}
Surface gravity (log g)	4.390±0.012 cgs
Temperature	5,568±4 K
Metallicity [Fe/H]	+0.006±0.004 dex
Rotation	32.1±0.2 d
Rotational velocity (v sin i)	3.9±0.9 km/s
Age	7.70+0.28 −0.26 Gyr

Other designations
- BD−17°3813, FK5 1345, GCTP 3039.00, GJ 506, HD 115617, HIP 64924, HR 5019, LHS 349, LTT 5111, SAO 157844

Database references
SIMBAD	data
Exoplanet Archive	data
ARICNS	data

61 Virginis (abbreviated 61 Vir) is a G-type main-sequence star (G7V) slightly less massive than the Sun (which has a hotter G2V spectral type), located 27.8 light-years (8.5 parsecs) away in the constellation of Virgo. The composition of this star is nearly identical to the Sun.

== Description ==
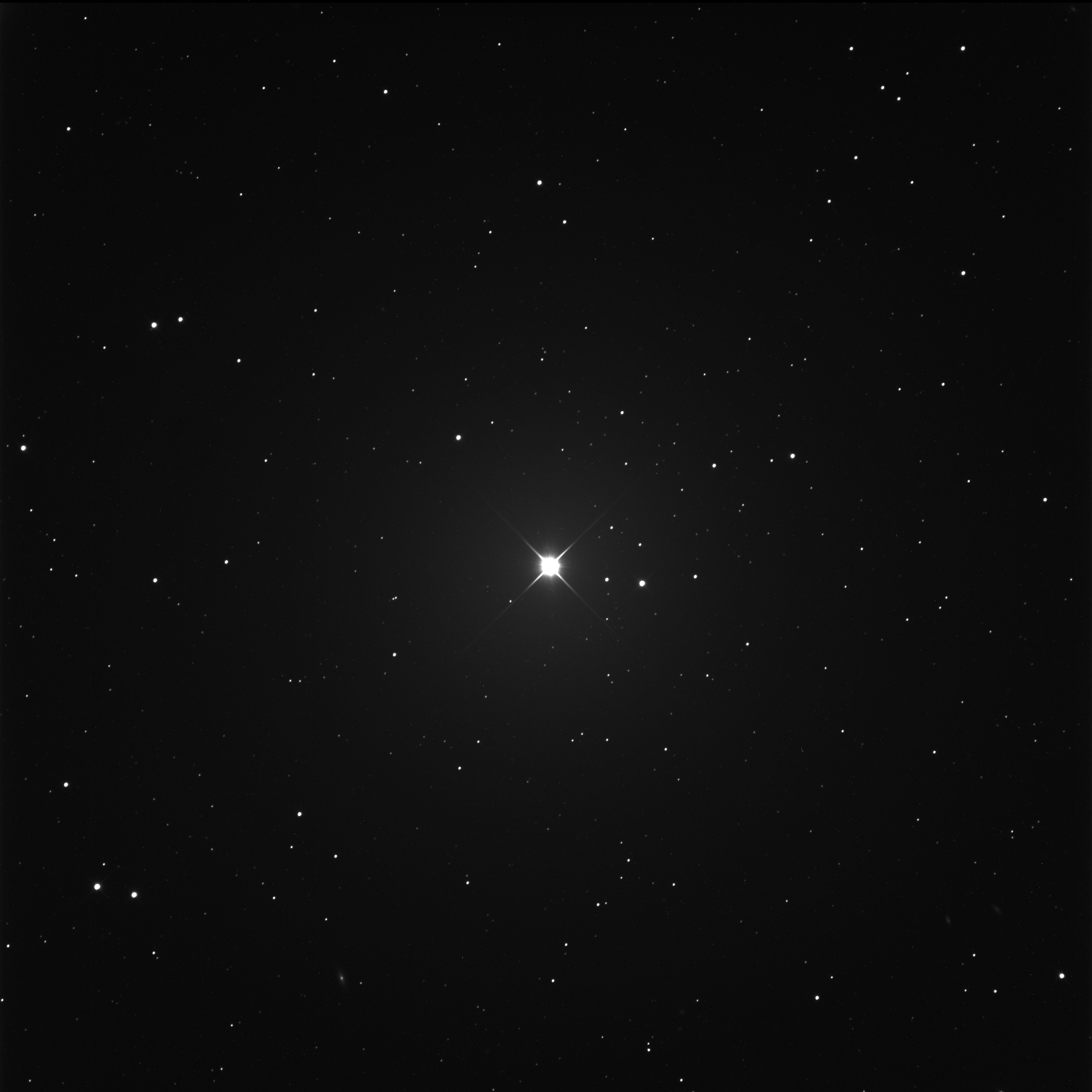
61 Vir as seen with a 12.5" telescope with a field of view of 45.1 arcminutes

61 Virginis is a fifth-magnitude G-type main-sequence star with a stellar classification of G7 V. It is faint but visible to the naked eye in the zodiac constellation of Virgo, close to Spica, the brightest star in the constellation. The designation 61 Virginis originated in the star catalogue of English astronomer John Flamsteed, as part of his Historia Coelestis Britannica. An 1835 account of Flamsteed's work by English astronomer Francis Baily noted that the star showed a proper motion. This made the star of interest for parallax studies, and by 1950 a mean annual value of 0.006″ was obtained, resulting in a distance of 170 pc (550 ly). (Note: The distance in parsecs is obtained by inverting the parallax in arcseconds. For parallaxes in milliarcseconds, the value must be divided by 1000.) The present day result, obtained with data from the Gaia satellite, gives a parallax of 117.17 mas (0.117"), which corresponds to a distance of 8.534 pc (27.83 ly).

This star is similar in physical properties to the Sun, with around 93% of the Sun's mass, 99% of the radius, and 82% of the luminosity. The abundance of elements is also similar to the Sun, with the star having 101% of the Sun's proportion of iron to hydrogen. It is older than the Sun, around 7.7 billion years old, and is spinning with a leisurely projected rotational velocity of 4 km/s at the equator. On average, there is only a low level of activity in the stellar chromosphere and it is a candidate for being in a Maunder minimum state, but it was suspected as variable in 1988, and a burst of activity was observed between Julian days [24]54800 (29 November 2008) and 55220 (23 January 2010).

The space velocity components of this star are U = –37.9, V = –35.3 and W = –24.7 km/s. 61 Vir is orbiting through the Milky Way galaxy at a distance of 6.9 kpc from the core, with an eccentricity of 0.15. It is believed to be a member of the disk population.

== Planetary system ==
Diagram of the 61 Virginis system

On 14 December 2009, scientists announced the discovery of three exoplanets with minimum masses between 5 and 25 times that of Earth orbiting 61 Virginis, using the radial velocity method at the Keck and Anglo-Australian Observatories. The three planets all orbit very near the star; when compared to the orbits of the planets in the Solar System, all three would orbit inside that of Venus. The two outer planets likely resemble Uranus and Neptune, while the innermost planet may be a mini-Neptune or a rocky super-Earth.

The outermost of these three planets, 61 Virginis d (also designated HD 115617 d), was initially not detected in the HARPS data as of 2012 until a reanalysis of the data was done in 2023. A 2021 study listed it as a false positive, but in 2023 two published studies further confirmed it based on an additional 10 years of radial velocity data, though with a smaller minimum mass.

Assuming the planets are aligned with the disk around the star, 61 Virginis b, c and d should have masses of 6.3, 19.8 and 12.6 M_{🜨}. (Note: Calculated from Msini/sin(i). The source's claimed disk-aligned mass of 0.197 M_{J} for planet b is a typo of 0.0197 M_{J}.)

=== Debris disk ===
The ecliptic of the 61 Virginis system, as inferred from its dust disc, is inclined to the Solar System at 77°. The star itself is probably inclined at 72°.

A survey with the Spitzer Space Telescope revealed an excess of infrared radiation at a wavelength of 160 μm. This indicated the presence of a debris disk in orbit around the star. This disk was resolved at 70 μm. It was then thought to correspond to an inner radius of 96 AU from the star and outer radius at 195 AU; it is now constrained 30 to over 100 AU. The total mass of the disk is 5 × 10^{−5} the mass of the Earth.

On 27 November 2012, the European Space Agency declared that the debris disc (like that of the Gliese 581 planetary system) has "at least 10 times" as many comets as does the Solar System's Kuiper belt.

=== Limits on additional planets ===
In 1988, a study surmised that 61 Virginis was a "possible variable", but no companions were then found. A subsequent study, over eleven years, also failed to find any companion up to the mass of Jupiter and out to 3 AU.

As of 2012, "planets more massive than Saturn orbiting within 6 AU" were ruled out. The ESA has found no evidence for Saturn-mass planets beyond that.

Additional data is needed to confirm the possibility of more sub-Saturn planets between 0.5 and 30 AU from the star. An Earth-mass planet in the star's habitable zone (which would still be too small to detect with current technology) remains possible.

The 61 Virginis planetary system
Companion (in order from star)	Mass	Semimajor axis (AU)	Orbital period (days)	Eccentricity	Inclination (°)	Radius
b	≥6.11±0.24 M_{🜨}	0.050±0.001	4.2150±0.0001	0.11±0.03	—	—
c	≥19.33±0.70 M_{🜨}	0.216±0.004	38.073±0.003	0.07±0.01	—	—
d	≥12.24±0.59 M_{🜨}	0.47±0.01	123.12±0.08	0.12±0.03	—	—
Debris disk	30–>100 AU				77°	—

== View from 61 Virginis ==
The Sun is visible from the system as a magnitude 4.50 star close to the stars Hamal, Beta Arietis and Alpha Centauri. Arcturus (magnitude −1.01) is the brightest star of the night sky.

== See also ==
- List of star systems within 25–30 light-years
- List of stars in Virgo
- Lists of exoplanets
