= 61 Virginis b =

Hot super-Earth orbiting 61 Virginis

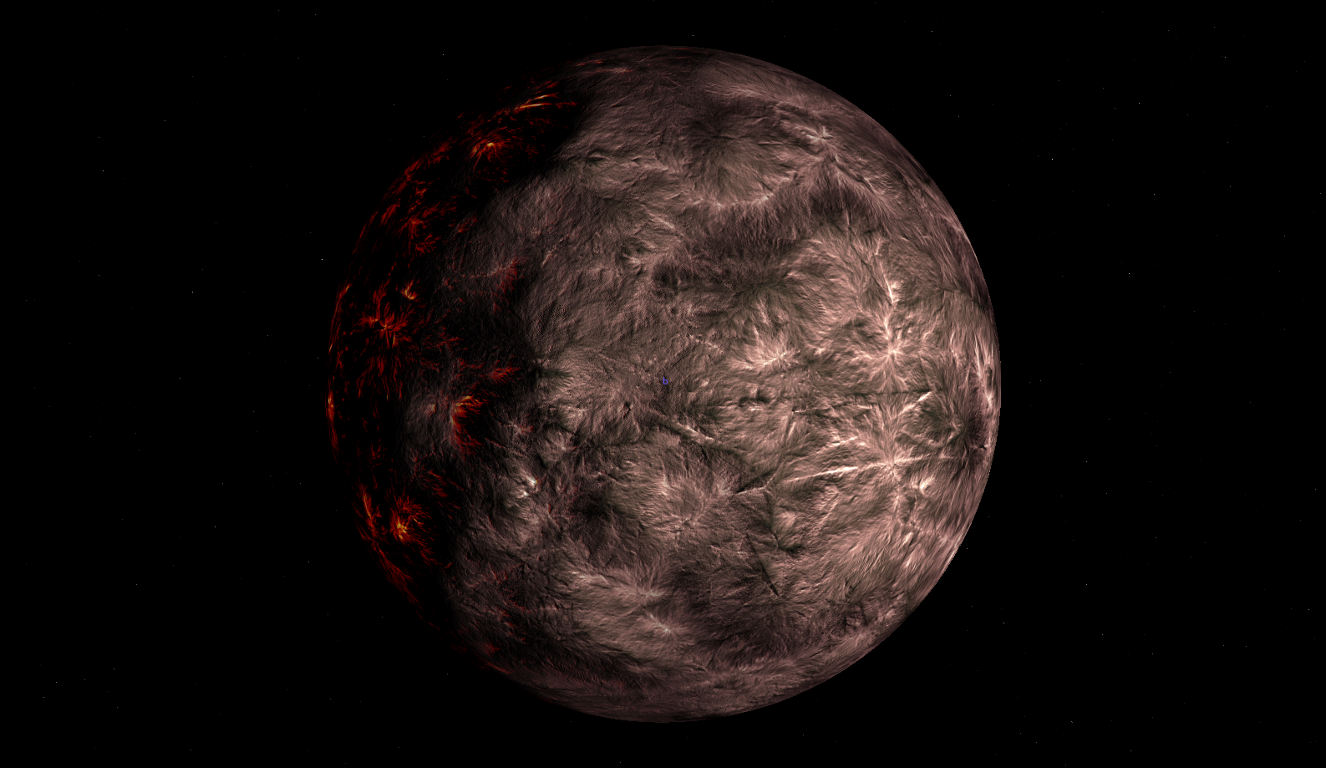
- Artist's impression of 61 Virginis b as a hot super-Earth, with some sporadic volcanic activity.

Discovery
- Discovered by: Vogt et al.
- Discovery site: Keck Observatory; Anglo-Australian Observatory
- Discovery date: 14 December 2009
- Detection method: Radial velocity

Orbital characteristics
- Apastron: 0.056163 AU
- Periastron: 0.044239 AU
- Semi-major axis: 0.050201±0.000005 AU
- Eccentricity: 0.12±0.11
- Orbital period (sidereal): 4.2150±0.0006 d 101.16 h
- Average orbital speed: 130.01
- Time of periastron: 2453369.166
- Argument of periastron: 105±54
- Star: 61 Virginis

Physical characteristics
- Mean radius: ~1.6 R_{🜨}
- Mass: ≥ 5.1 M_{🜨}
- Temperature: 1,054 K (781 °C; 1,438 °F)

61 Virginis b (abbreviated 61 Vir b) is an extrasolar planet, orbiting the 5th magnitude G-type star 61 Virginis, in Virgo. This planet has a minimum mass of 5.1 times that of Earth and is an example of a super-Earth planet. It orbits very close to the star, at a distance of 0.050201 AU with an eccentricity of 0.12. This planet was discovered on 14 December 2009 using the radial velocity method taken at Keck and Anglo-Australian Observatories.

== Characteristics ==
=== Mass, radius and temperature ===
61 Virginis b is a super-Earth, an exoplanet with a radius and mass bigger than Earth, but smaller than that of the ice giants Neptune and Uranus. It has an equilibrium temperature of 1,054 K (781 °C; 1,438 °F). It has an estimated minimum mass of around 5.1 M_{🜨}, and a potential radius of 1.6 R_{🜨}, based on its mass.

=== Host star ===
The planet orbits a (G-type) star named 61 Virginis, orbited by a total of three planets. The star has a mass of 0.94 M_{☉} and a radius of 0.98 R_{☉}. It has a temperature of 5531 K and is about 8.96 billion years old. In comparison, the Sun is 4.6 billion years old and has a temperature of 5778 K. The star has slightly less metals then the Sun, with a metallicity ([Fe/H]) of −0.03, or 94% of the solar amount. Its luminosity (L_{☉}) is 80% that of the Sun.

The star's apparent magnitude, or how bright it appears from Earth's perspective, is 4.74. Therefore, it can be seen with the naked eye.

=== Orbit ===
61 Virginis b orbits its host star with an orbital period of 4.21 days at a distance of about 0.05 AU (compared to Mercury's from the Sun, which is 0.38 AU). It receives 296.5 times more sunlight that Earth does from the Sun.

The planet may be tidally locked meaning that there is a permanent day side and a permanent night side.

== Discovery ==
The search for 61 Virginis b started when its host star was chosen an ideal target for a planet search using the radial velocity method (in which the gravitational pull of a planet on its star is measured by observing the resulting Doppler shift), as stellar activity would not overly mask or mimic Doppler spectroscopy measurements. It was also confirmed that 61 Virginis is neither a binary star nor a quickly rotating star, common false positives when searching for transiting planets.

Analysis of the resulting data found that the radial velocity variations most likely indicated the existence of a planet. The net result was an estimate of a 5.1 M_{🜨} planetary companion orbiting the star at a distance of 0.05 AU with an eccentricity of 0.12.

An attempt to determine if the planet transits its host star using the Spitzer Space Telescope unfortunately failed due to technical issues related to the brightness of the star.

== Look also at ==
- List of star systems within 25–30 light-years
