= 32 Virginis =

Variable star in the constellation Virgo

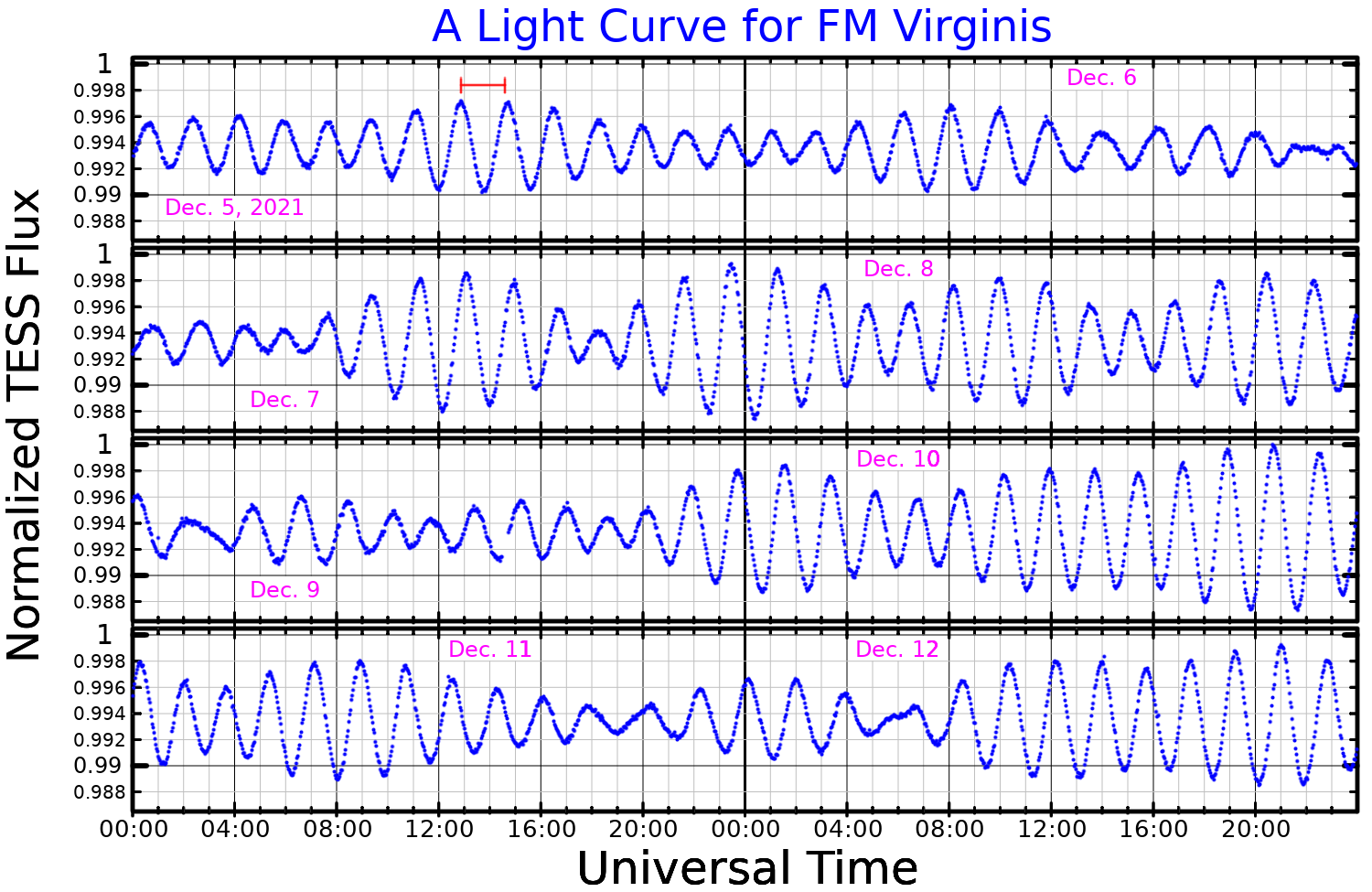
- A light curve for FM Virginis, plotted from TESS data. The 103.51 minute period is marked in red.

Observation data Epoch J2000.0 Equinox ICRS
- Constellation: Virgo
- Right ascension: 12^{h} 45^{m} 37.05805^{s}
- Declination: +07° 40′ 23.9689″
- Apparent magnitude (V): 5.20 - 5.28

Characteristics
- Spectral type: F0 IIIm (primary) + A7V (secondary)
- U−B color index: +0.15
- B−V color index: +0.33
- Variable type: Delta Scuti

Astrometry
Proper motion (μ)	RA: −107.527±0.697 mas/yr Dec.: 4.915±0.344 mas/yr
Parallax (π)	12.8075±0.3062 mas
Distance	255 ± 6 ly (78 ± 2 pc)
Absolute magnitude (M_{V})	+1.75

Orbit
Period (P)	38.324 d
Eccentricity (e)	0.074±0.006
Periastron epoch (T)	2434039.463±0.038
Argument of periastron (ω) (primary)	210.02±5.1°
Semi-amplitude (K_{1}) (primary)	48.05±0.33 km/s

Details

primary (Delta Scuti variable)
Mass	2.05 M_{☉}
Surface gravity (log g)	3.75 cgs
Temperature	7,450 K
Rotational velocity (v sin i)	24 km/s

secondary
Mass	1.9 M_{☉}
Rotational velocity (v sin i)	140 km/s

Other designations
- FM Vir, d^{2} Virginis, HD 110951, BD+08 2639, HIP 62267, HR 4847, SAO 119574, Boss 3323

Database references
SIMBAD	data

32 Virginis, also known as FM Virginis, is a star located about 250 light years from the Earth, in the constellation Virgo. Its apparent magnitude ranges from 5.20 to 5.28, making it faintly visible to the naked eye of an observer well away from city lights. 32 Virginis is a binary star, and the more massive component of the binary is a Delta Scuti variable star which oscillates with a dominant period of 103.51 minutes.

In 1914, Walter Sydney Adams announced that 32 Virginis is a spectroscopic binary. John Beattie Cannon published the first set of orbital elements for the binary system in 1915. Corrado Bartolini et al. made photometric observations of the star in early 1971, and found that the star showed variability due to pulsations. In 1974, 32 Virginis was given the variable star designation FM Virginis. Donald Kurtz et al. determined that the star was a Delta Scuti variable, in 1976.

The primary star is believed to be an Am star similar to Rho Puppis - a pulsating post-main sequence star.
