= SS Virginis =

Star in the constellation Virgo

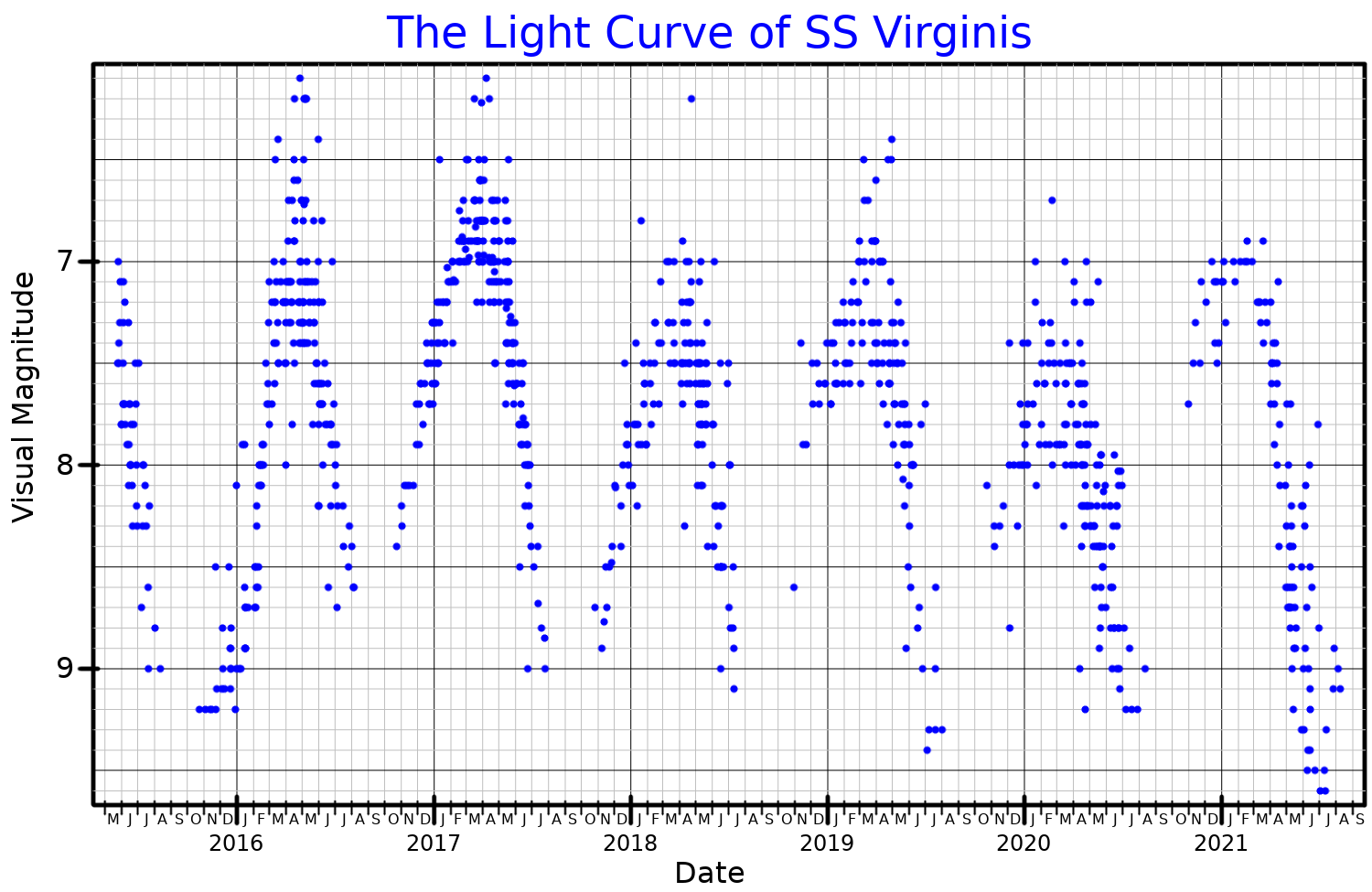
- The visual band light curve of SS Virginis, from AAVSO data

Observation data Epoch J2000 Equinox ICRS
- Constellation: Virgo
- Right ascension: 12^{h} 25^{m} 14.3952^{s}
- Declination: +00° 46′ 10.947″
- Apparent magnitude (V): 6.0 - 9.6

Characteristics
- Evolutionary stage: AGB
- Spectral type: C6_{3}e (Ne)
- Variable type: SRa

Astrometry
Radial velocity (R_{v})	2 km/s
Proper motion (μ)	RA: −1.448±0.228 mas/yr Dec.: 0.571±0.151 mas/yr
Parallax (π)	1.4348±0.1018 mas
Distance	2,300 ± 200 ly (700 ± 50 pc)

Details
Mass	3.2 M_{☉}
Radius	500 R_{☉}
Luminosity	5,400 L_{☉}
Surface gravity (log g)	1.86 cgs
Temperature	2,445 K
Metallicity [Fe/H]	−0.38 dex

Other designations
- SS Vir, BD+01°2694, HD 108105, HIP 120212, TYC 282-753-1

Database references
SIMBAD	data

SS Virginis is a semiregular variable star that appears with a strong red hue. It varies in apparent magnitude from a maximum of 6.0 to a minimum of 9.6 over a typical period of 361 days. Max Wolf and Gisela Wolf announced the discovery of this star, from photographs taken at Heidelberg Observatory in 1905. Its spectral class is C6_{3}e, indicating that SS Virginis is a carbon star. SS Virginis has a hydrogen-alpha emission line that varies widely, synchronized with the overall variations in light. The line becomes far more prominent as the star becomes brighter. Observations made in the near-infrared spectrum indicate that it has a radius of 500 solar radii, and its temperature is between 2,405 and 2,485 K.

The location of SS Virginis is two degrees north-following of η Virginis.
