= Beta Virginis =

Star in the constellation Virgo

β Virginis (Zavijava)
- Location of β Virginis (circled)

Observation data Epoch J2000 Equinox ICRS
- Constellation: Virgo
- Right ascension: 11^{h} 50^{m} 41.71824^{s}
- Declination: +01° 45′ 52.9910″
- Apparent magnitude (V): 3.604

Characteristics
- Evolutionary stage: Main sequence turnoff
- Spectral type: F9 V
- U−B color index: +0.090
- B−V color index: +0.553

Astrometry
| Radial velocity (R_{v}) | +4.1 km/s |
| Proper motion (μ) | RA: +740.23 mas/yr Dec.: −270.43 mas/yr |
| Parallax (π) | 91.50±0.22 mas |
| Distance | 35.65 ± 0.09 ly (10.93 ± 0.03 pc) |
| Absolute magnitude (M_{V}) | 3.41 |

Details
| Mass | 1.413±0.061 M_{☉} |
| Radius | 1.681±0.008 R_{☉} |
| Luminosity | 3.572±0.052 L_{☉} |
| Habitable zone inner limit | 1.39 AU |
| Habitable zone outer limit | 3.25 AU |
| Surface gravity (log g) | 4.125±0.010 cgs |
| Temperature | 6,132±26 K |
| Metallicity [Fe/H] | 0.20 dex |
| Rotation | 9.2±0.2 days |
| Rotational velocity (v sin i) | 6.1±2.6 km/s |
| Age | 2.9 ± 0.3, ~3.3 Gyr |

Other designations
- Zavijava, Zavijah, Alaraph, β Vir, 5 Virginis, BD+02°2489, FK5 445, GJ 449, HD 102870, HIP 57757, HR 4540, SAO 119076

Database references
| SIMBAD | data |
| ARICNS | data |

Beta Virginis, a name Latinised from β Virginis, is a star in the equatorial constellation of Virgo. It has the proper name Zavijava (/ˌzævɪˈdʒævə/), and, despite its designation 'beta', is the fifth-brightest star in Virgo with an apparent visual magnitude of 3.604. The distance to this star is around 35.7 light-years based on parallax; it is drifting further away with a radial velocity of +4.1 km/s. It is 0.69 of a degree north of the ecliptic, so it can be occulted by the Moon and (rarely) by planets. The next planetary occultation of Beta Virginis will take place on 9 November 2210, by Venus; although an occultation by the same planet might be visible on 11 August 2069 from the South Pole.

== Nomenclature ==
β Virginis (Latinised to Beta Virginis) is the star's Bayer designation.

It bore the traditional names Zavijava (also Zavijah, Zavyava and Zawijah) and Alaraph. Zavijava is from the Arabic زاوية العواء zāwiyat al-^{c}awwa’ 'corner of the barking (dog)'. In 2016, the International Astronomical Union organized a Working Group on Star Names (WGSN) to catalog and standardize proper names for stars. The WGSN approved the name Zavijava for this star on 21 August 2016 and it is now so entered in the IAU Catalog of Star Names.

In Chinese, 太微右垣 (Tài Wēi Yòu Yuán), meaning Right Wall of Supreme Palace Enclosure, refers to an asterism consisting of Beta Virginis, Sigma Leonis, Iota Leonis, Theta Leonis and Delta Leonis. Consequently, the Chinese name for Beta Virginis itself is 太微右垣一 (Tài Wēi Zuǒ Yuán yī, English: Supreme Palace Enclosure Right Wall One), representing 右執法 (Yòuzhífǎ), meaning The Right Law Administrator. 右執法 (Yòuzhífǎ), spelled Yew Chi Fa by R.H. Allen, means "the Right-hand Maintainer of Law".

== Properties ==
Beta Virginis is an F-type main-sequence star with a stellar classification of F9 V, which means it is generating energy through core hydrogen fusion. Larger and more massive than the Sun, it is comparatively metal-rich (that is, it has a higher preponderance of elements heavier than helium). It is radiating 3.6 times the luminosity of the Sun from its photosphere at an effective temperature of 6,132 K. Sun-like oscillations have been detected in Beta Virginis, allowing its internal structure to be modelled in more detail. It is around 3 billion years old with a projected rotational velocity of 6.1 km/s and appears to be near the end of its main sequence lifetime.

Beta Virginis appears to have mild chromospheric activity, which tentatively cycles on timescales of approximately 80 days. Zeeman-Doppler imaging reveals the star to have a relatively simple dipolar poloidal magnetic field. The star also displays relatively fast differential rotation, typical of F-type stars.

== Search for planets ==
According to Nelson & Angel (1998), Beta Virginis could host two or three jovian planets in wide orbits. The authors have set an upper limit of 1.9, 5 and 23 Jupiter masses for the putative planets with orbital periods of 15, 25 and 50 years, respectively. Also Campbell et al. 1988 inferred the existence of planetary objects or even brown dwarfs around Beta Virginis. However, more recent studies have not confirmed the existence of any substellar companion around Beta Virginis yet. McDonald Observatory team has set limits to the presence of one or more planets with masses between 0.16 and 4.2 Jupiter masses and average separations spanning between 0.05 and 5.2 astronomical units.

In 2025, it was noted that proper motion measurements of Zavijava taken by the Hipparcos and Gaia spacecraft show a statistically significant difference; this acceleration suggests the presence of a giant planet.
