= Virgo (constellation) =

Zodiac constellation straddling the celestial equator

- Constellation
- List of stars in Virgo
- Abbreviation: Vir
- Genitive: Virginis
- Pronunciation: /ˈvɜːrɡoʊ/, genitive /ˈvɜːrdʒɪnɪs/
- Symbolism: the Maiden
- Right ascension: 13^{h}
- Declination: −4°
- Quadrant: SQ3
- Area: 1294 sq. deg. (2nd)
- Main stars: 9, 15
- Bayer/Flamsteed stars: 96
- Stars brighter than 3.00^{m}: 3
- Stars within 10.00 pc (32.62 ly): 10
- Brightest star: Spica (α Vir) (0.98^{m})
- Nearest star: Ross 128
- Messier objects: 11
- Meteor showers: Virginids; Mu Virginids
- Bordering constellations: Boötes; Coma Berenices; Leo; Crater; Corvus; Hydra; Libra; Serpens Caput
- Visible at latitudes between +68° and −77°. Best visible at 21:00 (9 p.m.) during the month of May.

Virgo is one of the constellations of the zodiac. The name means "maiden" in Latin and its traditional astrological symbol is. Between Leo to the west and Libra to the east, lying in the south, it is the second-largest constellation in the sky (after Hydra) and the largest constellation in the zodiac. The ecliptic intersects the celestial equator within this constellation and Pisces. Underlying these technical two definitions, the sun passes directly overhead of the equator, within this constellation, at the September equinox. Virgo can be easily found through its brightest star, Spica, (in Latin "grain headed").

== Characteristics ==
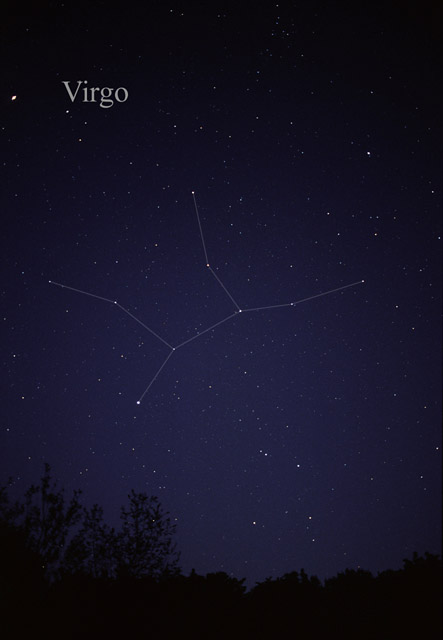
The constellation Virgo

Virgo is prominent in the spring sky in the Northern Hemisphere, visible all night in March and April. As the largest zodiac constellation, the Sun takes 44 days to pass through it, longer than any other. From 1990 and until 2062, this will take place from September 16 to October 30. It is located in the third quadrant of the Southern Hemisphere (SQ3) and can be seen at latitudes between +80° and -80°.

The bright star Spica makes it easy to locate Virgo, as it can be found by following the curve of the Big Dipper/Plough to Arcturus in Boötes and continuing from there in the same curve ("follow the arc to Arcturus and speed on to Spica").

Due to the effects of precession, the autumn equinox point lies within the boundaries of Virgo very close to β Virginis. This is one of the two points in the sky where the celestial equator crosses the ecliptic (the other being the vernal equinox point in the constellation of Pisces). From the 18th century to the 4th century BC, the Sun was in Libra on the autumnal equinox, shifting into Virgo thereafter. This point will pass into the neighboring constellation of Leo around the year 2440.

== Features ==
=== Stars ===
Besides Spica, other bright stars in Virgo include β Virginis (Zavijava), γ Virginis (Porrima), δ Virginis (Auva) and ε Virginis (Vindemiatrix). Other fainter stars that were also given names are ζ Virginis (Heze), η Virginis (Zaniah), ι Virginis (Syrma), κ Virginis (Kang), λ Virginis (Khambalia) and φ Virginis (Elgafar).

The constellation Virgo showing the IAU boundaries, the constellation stick figure, and labels for its brightest stars. Astrophotograph by Eckhard Slawik, from NOIRLab's 88 Constellations project.

The 7 main stars of Virgo form 2 distinct star patterns: Beta, Gamma, Delta, Epsilon and Eta Virginis; form an asterism known as "The Bowl of Virgo". Together with Spica and Theta Virginis, they form a Y shape.

The star 70 Virginis has one of the first known extrasolar planetary systems with one confirmed planet 7.5 times the mass of Jupiter.

The star Chi Virginis has one of the most massive planets ever detected, with a mass of 11.1 times that of Jupiter.

The sun-like star 61 Virginis has three known planets: one is a super-Earth and two are Neptune-mass planets.

SS Virginis is a variable star with a noticeable red color. It varies in magnitude from a minimum of 9.6 to a maximum of 6.0 over approximately one year.

=== Exoplanets ===
There are 35 verified exoplanets orbiting 29 stars in Virgo, including PSR B1257+12 (three planets), 70 Virginis (one planet), Chi Virginis (one planet), 61 Virginis (three planets), NY Virginis (two planets), and 59 Virginis (one planet).

=== Deep-sky objects ===
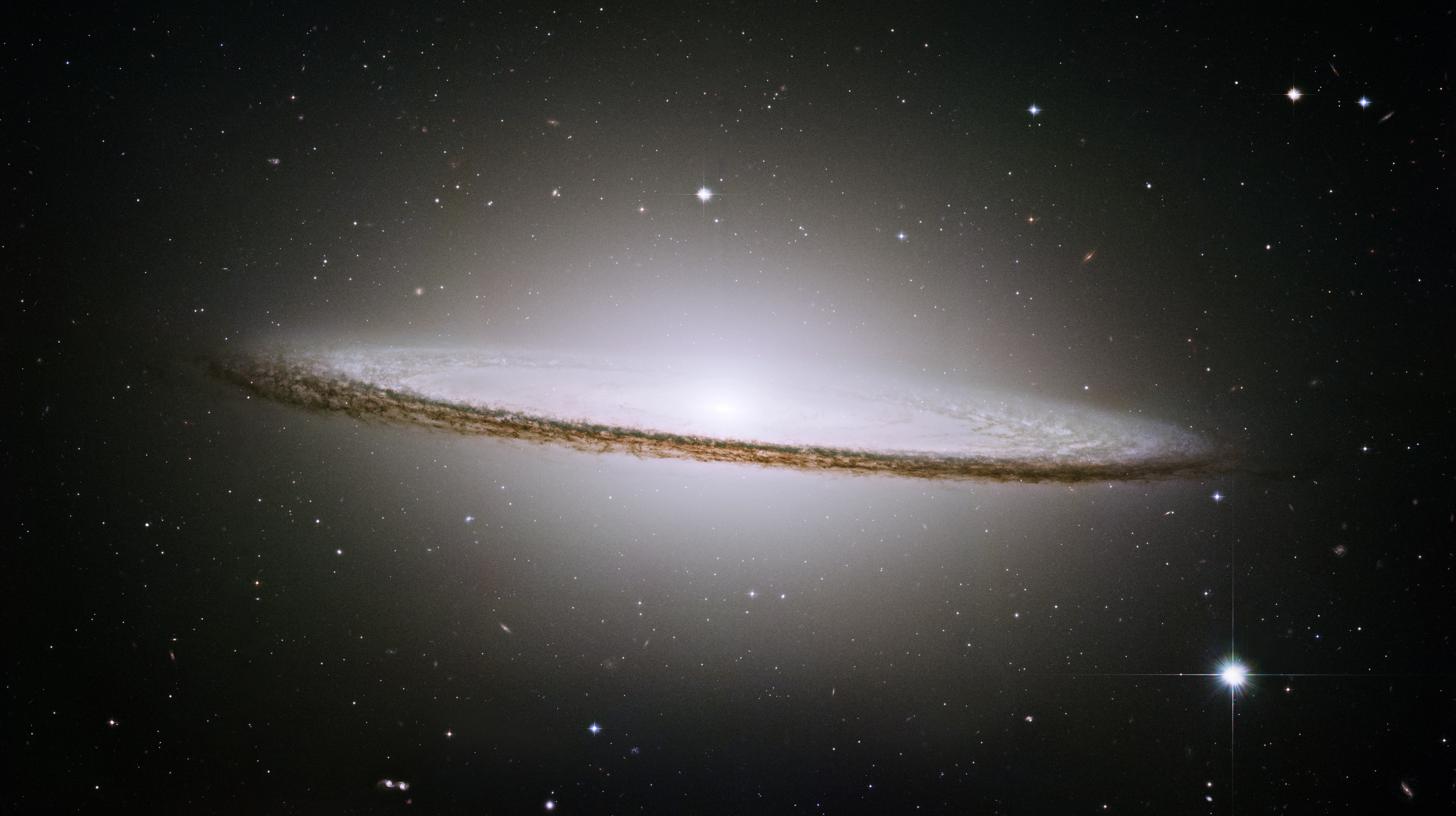
The lenticular galaxy Sombrero Galaxy

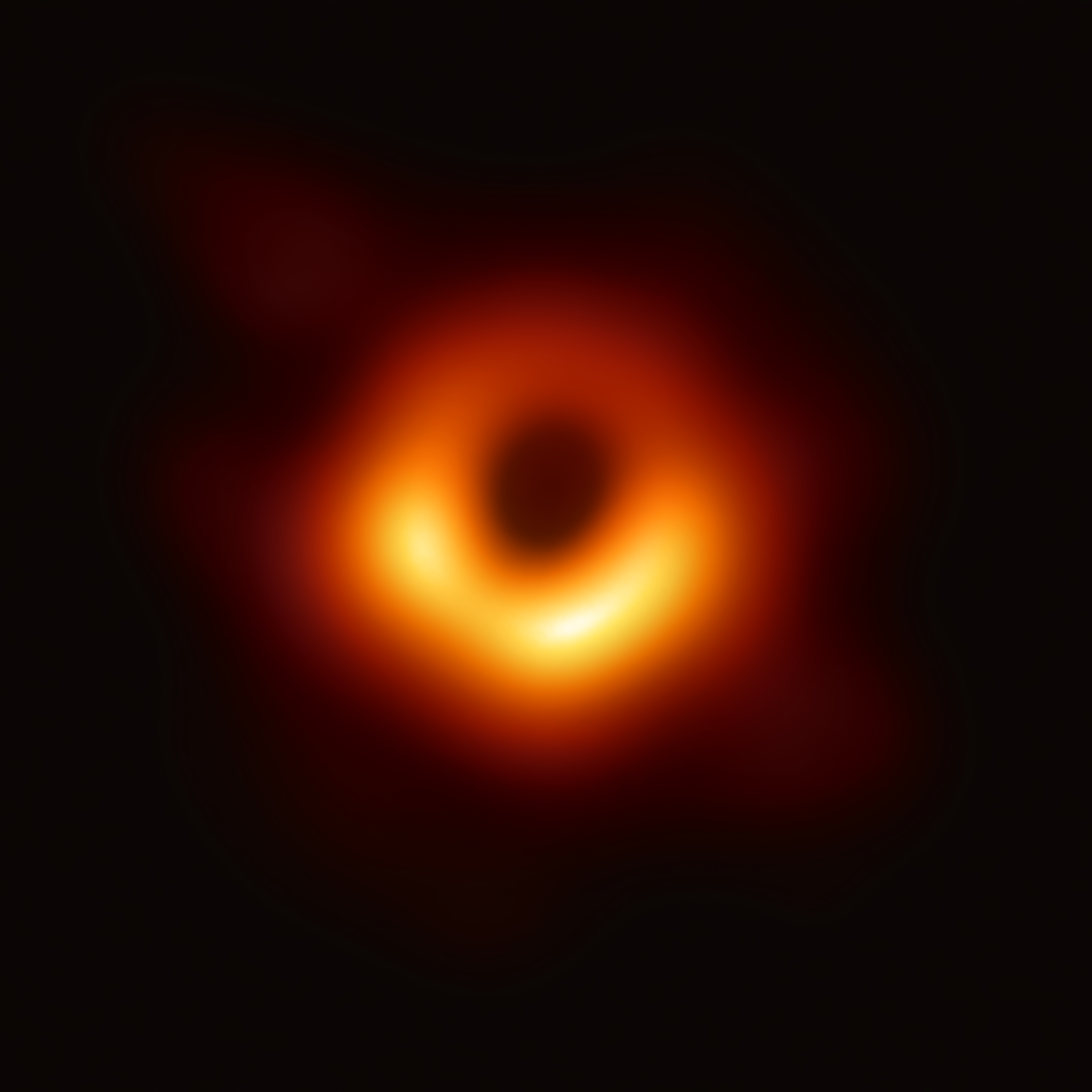
The shadow of the central black hole in the galaxy Messier 87 in Virgo, obtained by the Event Horizon Telescope collaboration. This is the first direct image of a black hole.

Because of the presence of a galaxy cluster (consequently called the Virgo Cluster) within its borders 5° to 12° west of ε Vir (Vindemiatrix), this constellation is especially rich in galaxies.

Some examples are Messier 49 (elliptical), Messier 58 (spiral), Messier 59 (elliptical), Messier 60 (elliptical), Messier 61 (spiral), Messier 84 (lenticular), Messier 86 (lenticular), Messier 87 (elliptical and a famous radio source), Messier 89 (elliptical) and Messier 90 (spiral). A noted galaxy that is not part of the cluster is the Sombrero Galaxy (M104), an unusual spiral galaxy. It is located about 10° due west of Spica.

NGC 4639 is a face-on barred spiral galaxy located 78 Mly from Earth (redshift 0.0034). Its outer arms have a high number of Cepheid variables, which are used as standard candles to determine astronomical distances. Because of this, astronomers used several Cepheid variables in NGC 4639 to calibrate type Ia supernovae as standard candles for more distant galaxies.

Virgo possesses several galaxy clusters, one of which is HCG 62. A Hickson Compact Group, HCG 62 is at a distance of 200 Mly from Earth (redshift 0.0137) and possesses a large central elliptical galaxy. It has a heterogeneous halo of extremely hot gas, posited to be due to the active galactic nucleus at the core of the central elliptical galaxy.

M87 is the largest galaxy in the Virgo cluster, and is at a distance of 60 Mly from Earth (redshift 0.0035). It is a major radio source, partially due to its jet of electrons being flung out of the galaxy by its central supermassive black hole. Because this jet is visible in several different wavelengths, it is of interest to astronomers who wish to observe black holes in a unique galaxy. On April 10, 2019, astronomers from the Event Horizon Telescope project released an image of its central black hole; the first direct image of one. With a mass of at least 7.2 billion times that of the Sun, it is the most massive black hole within the immediate vicinity of the Milky Way.

M84 is another elliptical radio galaxy in the constellation of Virgo; it is at a distance of 60 Mly (redshift 0.0035) as well. Astronomers have surmised that the speed of the gas clouds orbiting the core (approximately 400 km/s) indicates the presence of an object with a mass 300 million times that of the sun, which is most likely a black hole.

The Sombrero Galaxy, M104, is an edge-on spiral galaxy located 28 million light-years from Earth (redshift 0.0034). It has a bulge at its center made up of older stars that are larger than normal. It is surrounded by large, bright globular clusters and has a very prominent dust lane made up of polycyclic aromatic hydrocarbons.

NGC 4438 is a peculiar galaxy with an active galactic nucleus, at a distance of 50 Mly from Earth (redshift 0.0035). Its supermassive black hole is ejecting jets of matter, creating bubbles with a diameter of up to 78 ly.

NGC 4261 also has a black hole 20 ly from its center with a mass of 1.2 billion solar masses. It is located at a distance of 45 Mly from Earth (redshift 0.0075), and has an unusually dusty disk with a diameter of 300 ly. Along with M84 and M87, NGC 4261 has strong emissions in the radio spectrum.

Virgo is also home to the quasar 3C 273 which was the first quasar ever to be identified. With a magnitude of ~12.9, it is also the optically brightest quasar in the sky.

== Mythology and religion ==
=== Babylon ===
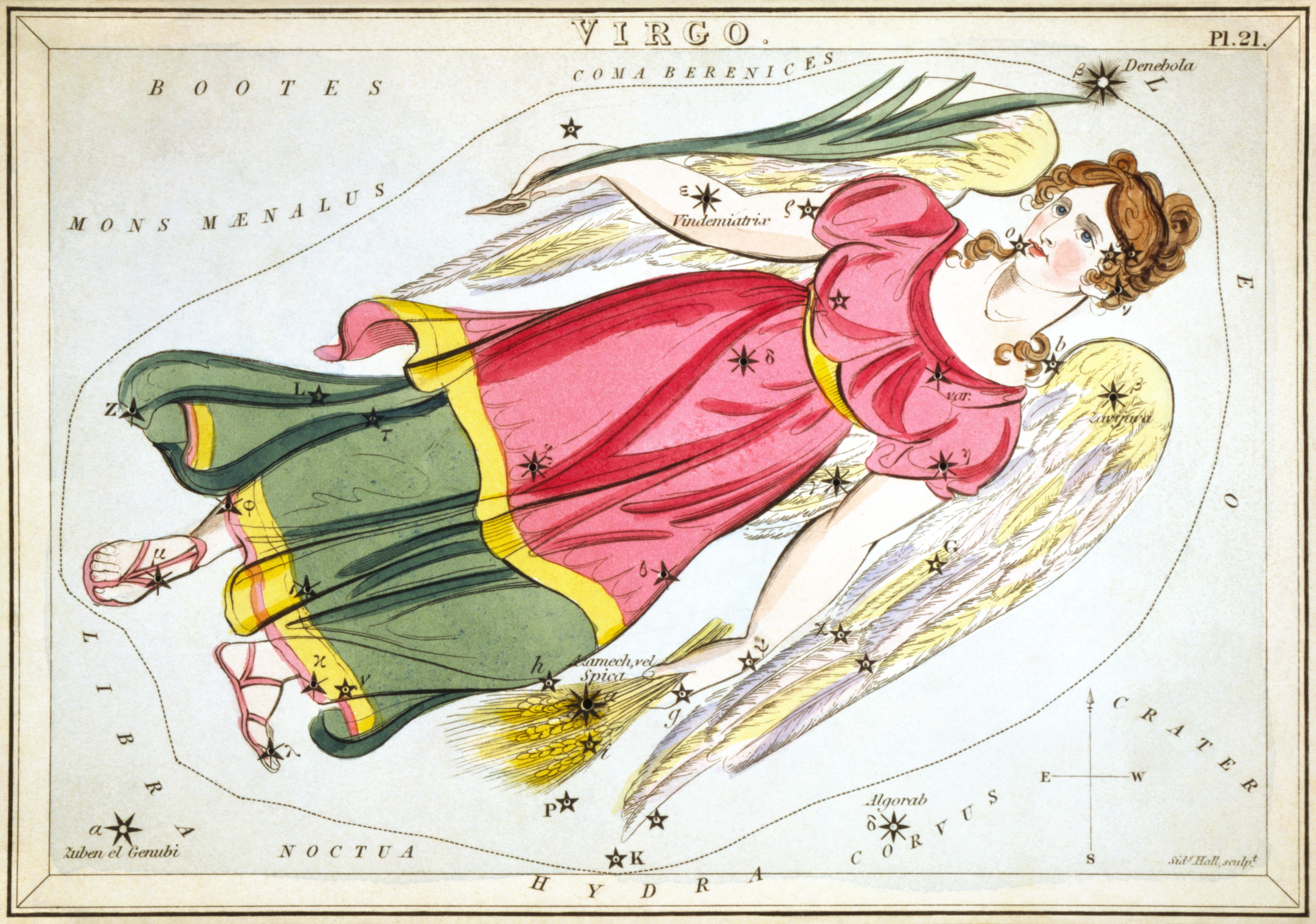
Virgo as depicted in Urania's Mirror, a set of constellation cards published in London c.1825

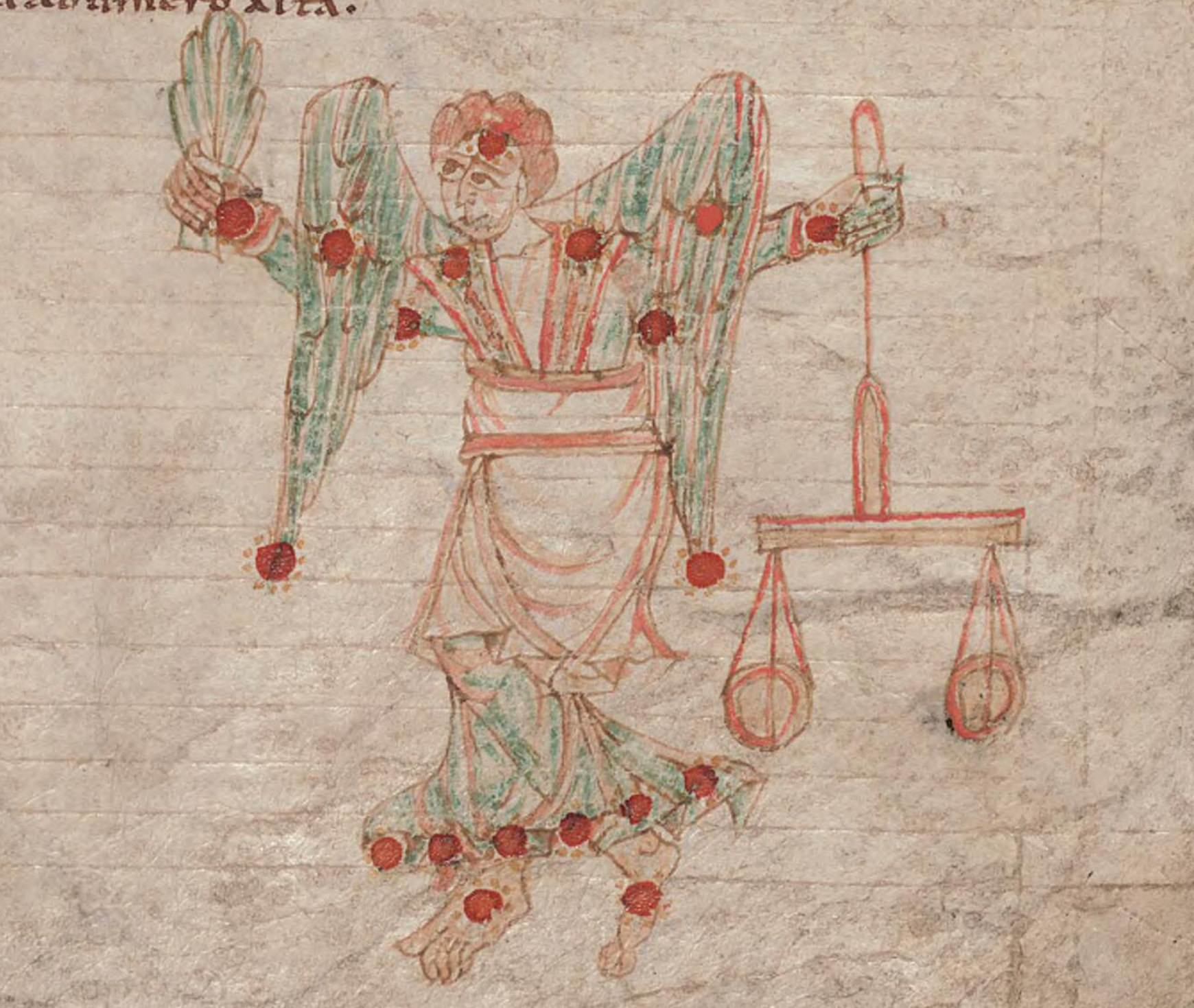
Depiction of Virgo, c.1000

In the Babylonian MUL.APIN (c. 10th century BC), part of this constellation was known as "The Furrow", representing the goddess Shala and her ear of grain. One star in this constellation, Spica, retains this tradition as it is Latin for "ear of grain", one of the major products of the Mesopotamian furrow. For this reason the constellation became associated with fertility. The constellation of Virgo in Hipparchus corresponds to two Babylonian constellations: the "Furrow" in the eastern sector of Virgo and the "Frond of Erua" in the western sector. The Frond of Erua was depicted as a goddess holding a palm-frond – a motif that still occasionally appears in much later depictions of Virgo.

=== Classical mythology ===
The Greeks and Romans identified the constellation with the goddesses Demeter and Persephone, as well as Astraea, a goddess of justice, who left earth during the end of the Silver Age and fled to the sky, becoming the constellation.

Erigone, the daughter of Icarius of Athens, was also associated with the constellation. Icarius, who had been favored by Dionysus and was killed by his shepherds while they were intoxicated after which Erigone hanged herself in grief. Dionysus is said to have placed the father and daughter in the stars as Boötes and Virgo, respectively.

In the Poeticon Astronomicon by Hyginus (1st century BC), Parthenos (Παρθένος) is the daughter of Apollo and Chrysothemis, who died a maiden and was placed among the stars as the constellation.

Diodorus Siculus has an alternative account, according to which Parthenos was the daughter of Staphylus and Chrysothemis. She and her sister, Molpadia, accidentally let one of their father's swine break a valuable wine bottle. Fearing their father's wrath, the girls threw themselves from a cliff, only to be saved by Apollo. The god took Molpadia to Castabus and Parthenos to Bubastis, where both sisters were deified.

=== Christianity ===
During the Middle Ages, Virgo was associated with the Virgin Mary. In Mexican tradition, the tilma of Our Lady of Guadalupe reflect various constellations in the sky, including Virgo over the heart, Leo over the womb, and Libra and Boötes along the lower mantle.

=== Hinduism ===
In Hindu astrology, it is known as Kanyā (कन्या), the sixth sign of the sidereal zodiac and is ruled by the planet Budha (बुद्ध; Mercury). Classified as an earth sign with a dual (mutable) nature, Kanyā is traditionally associated with intellect, analytical ability, service, health, and disciplined work. Classical texts such as the Brihat Parashara Hora Shastra (Devanagari: बृहत् पराशर होरा शास्त्र) describe natives of this sign as intelligent, detail-oriented, practical, modest, and skilled in communication.

== Gallery ==
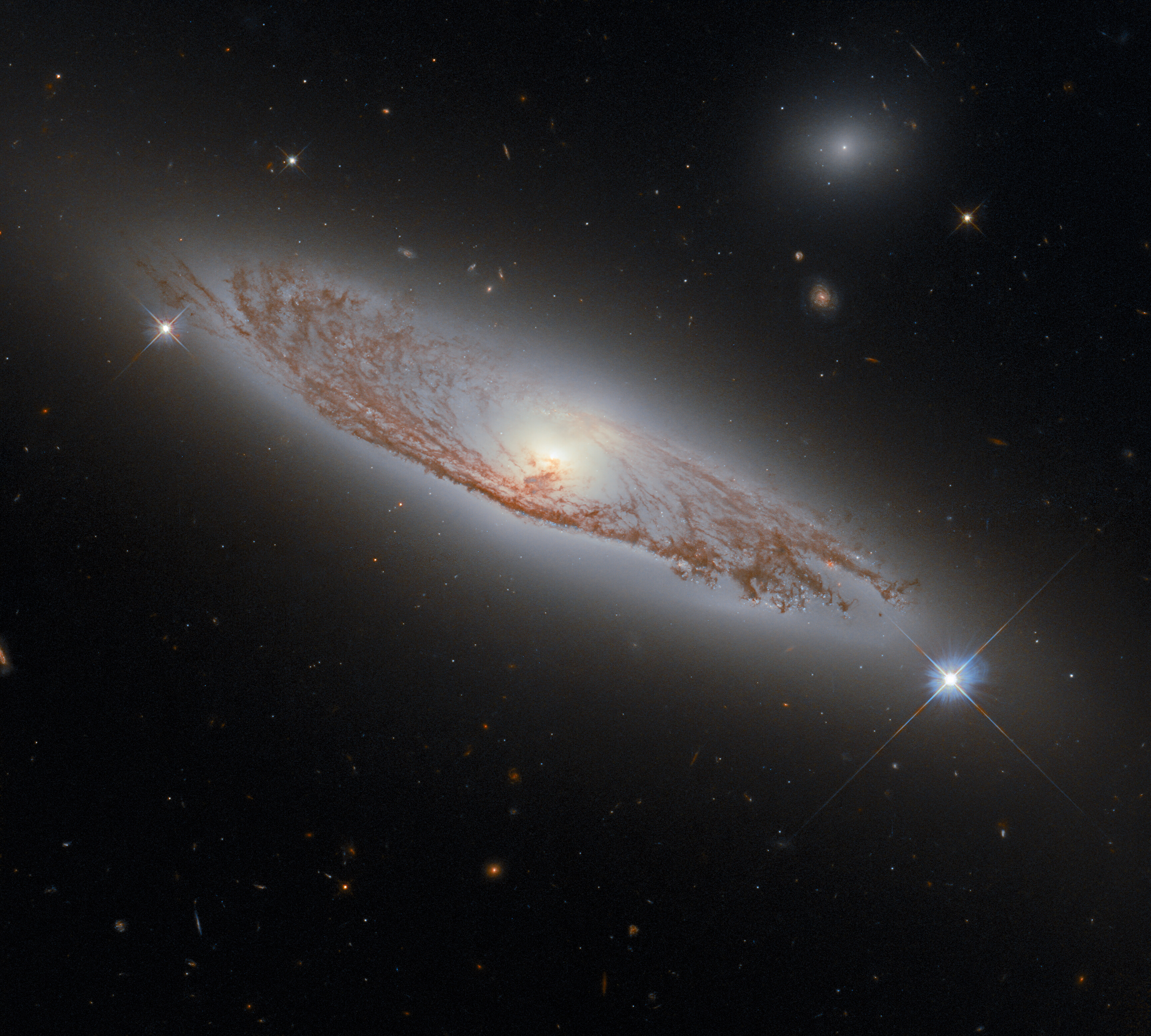
The spiral galaxy NGC 5037

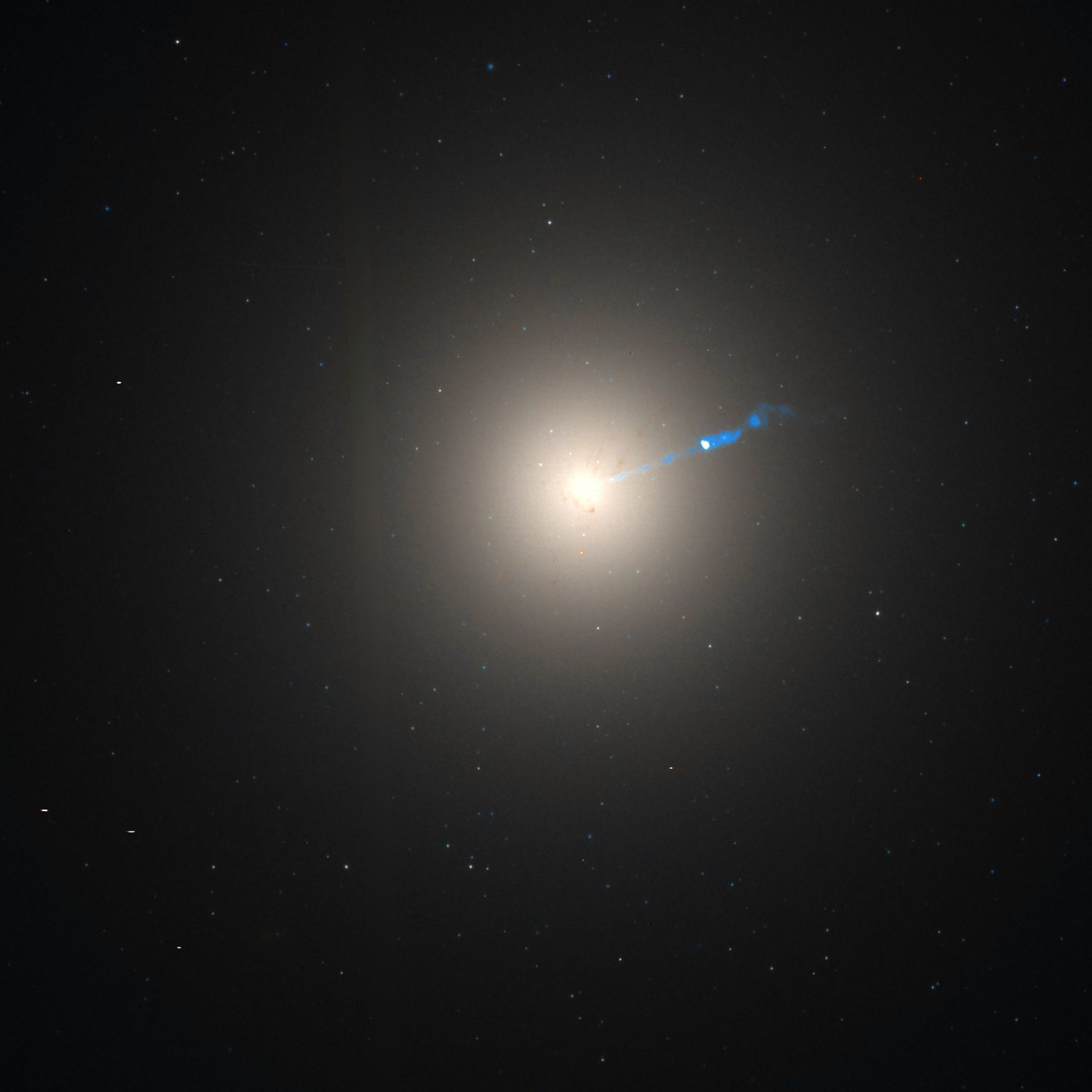
The elliptical galaxy Messier 87

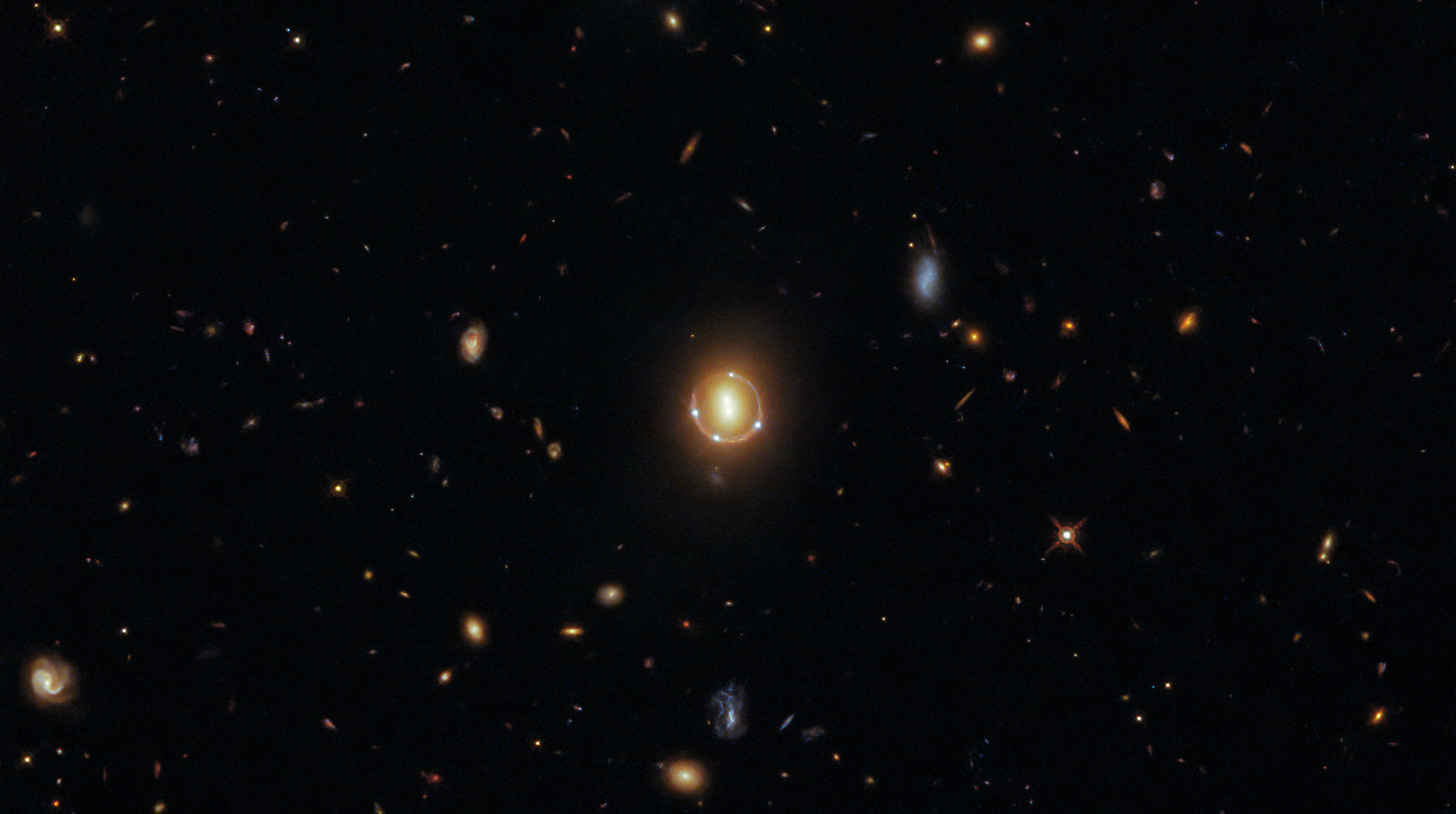
"Seeing Quintuple" a phenomenon known as gravitational lensing.

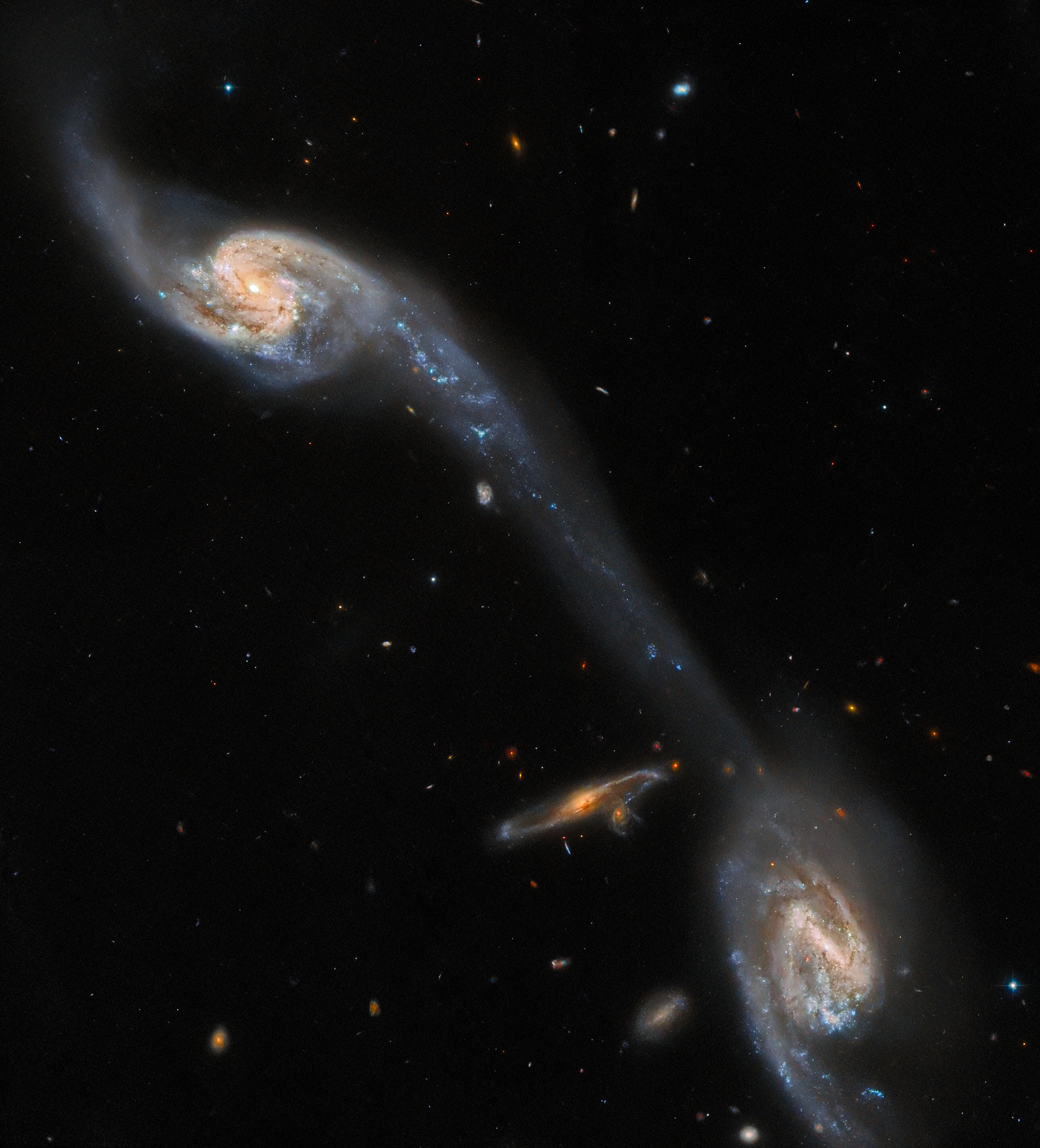
This image from the NASA/ESA Hubble Space Telescope shows two of the galaxies in the galactic triplet Arp 248.

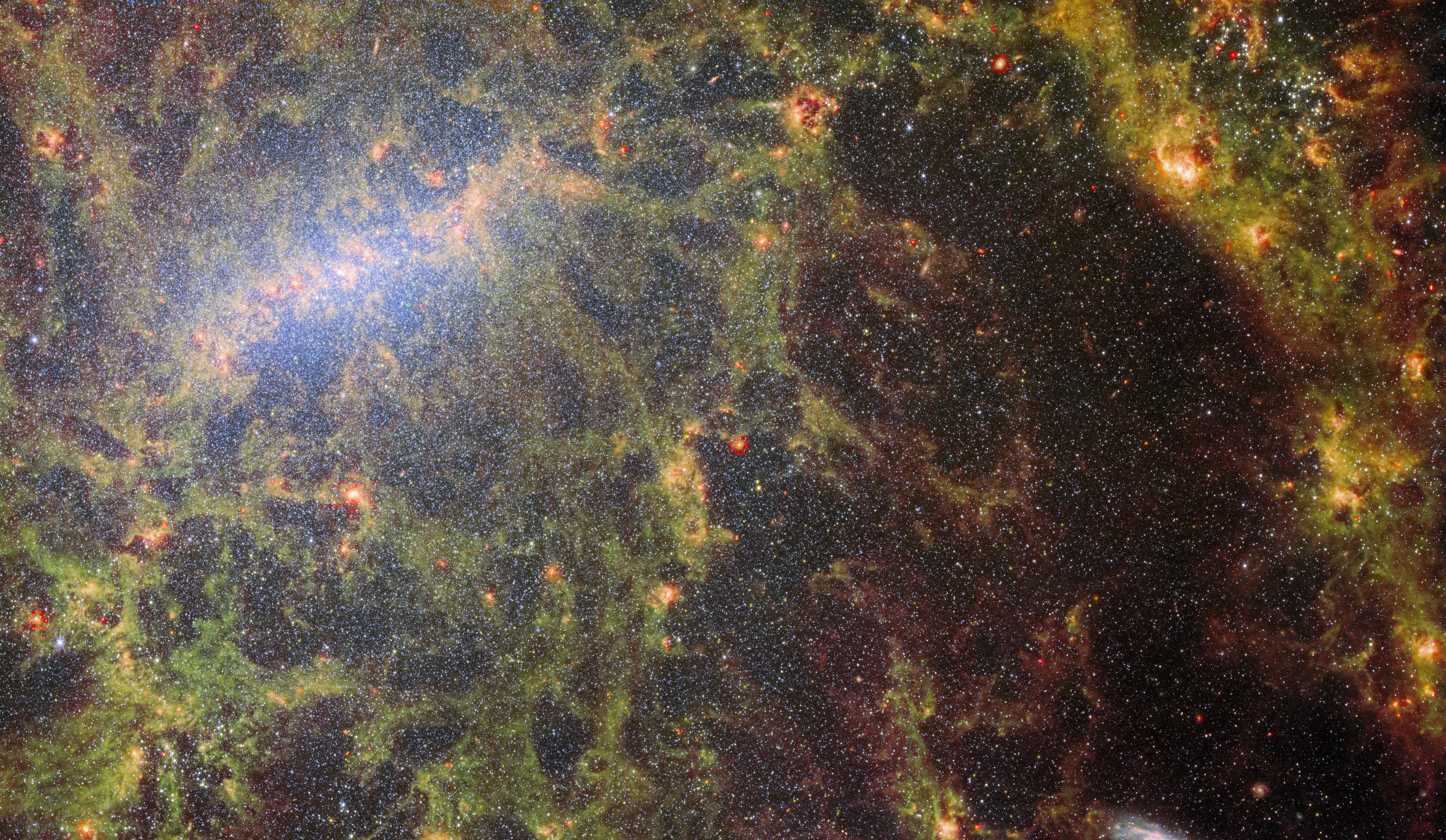
James Webb Space Telescope peers behind the bars to image the bright tendrils of gas and stars of the barred spiral galaxy NGC 5068. The galaxy lies around 17 million light-years from Earth in the constellation Virgo.

== See also ==
- Virgo (Chinese astronomy)
