= Supreme Palace enclosure =

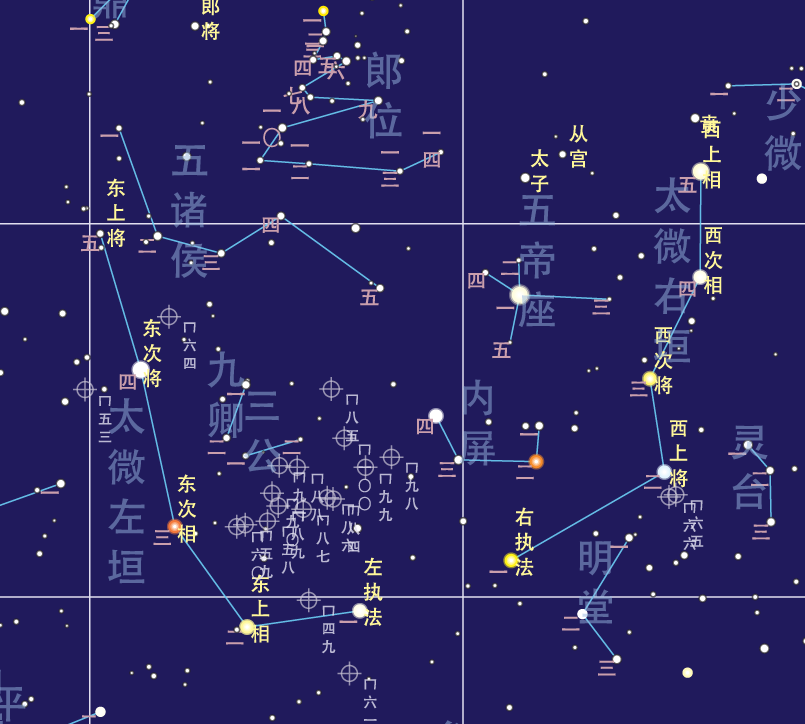
Tài Wēi Yuán map

Tai Wei Yuan, the Supreme Palace Enclosure (太微垣), is one of the San Yuan or Three enclosures. Stars and constellations of this group are visible during spring in the Northern Hemisphere (autumn in the Southern).

== Asterisms ==
The asterisms are:

English name	Chinese name	Number of stars	Western Constellation	Additional notes	Representing
Left Wall	太微左垣	5	Virgo / Coma Berenices	Consists of : The Left Law Administrator (左執法) → 1st star; The First Eastern Minister (東上相) → 2nd star; The Second Eastern Minister (東次相) → 3rd star; The Second Eastern General (東次將) → 4th star; The First Eastern General (東上將) → 5th star	Five guardian star in the left
Right Wall	太微右垣	5	Leo / Virgo	Consists of : The Right Law Administrator (右執法) → 1st star; The First Western General (西上將) → 2nd star; The Second Western General (西次將) → 3rd star; The Second Western Minister (西次相) → 4th star; The First Western Minister (西上相) → 5th star	Five guardian star in the right
Usher to the Court	謁者	1	Virgo		The officer in charge to interview the guests, also was ordered to ambassador
Three Excellencies	三公	3	Virgo		
Nine Senior Officers	九卿	3	Virgo		Officials of nine luxury units
Five Lords	五諸侯	5	Coma Berenices		Five lords of the Emperor
Inner Screen	內屏	4	Virgo		Small wall within the door
Seats of the Five Emperors	五帝座	5	Leo		Five Emperors chair
Officer of Honour	幸臣	1	Coma Berenices		Favorite of the courtiers
Crown Prince	太子	1	Leo		The crown prince
Retinue	從官	1	Leo		The emperor's attendants
Captain of the Bodyguards	郎將	1	Coma Berenices		High military officer
Emperor's Bodyguard	虎賁	1	Leo		Palace garrison commanders
Imperial Guards	常陳	7	Canes Venatici / Ursa Major		The army
Officers of the Imperial Guard	郎位	15	Coma Berenices		Clerical officer in military
The Hall of Glory	明堂	3	Leo		Places of Emperor Xuan Mingzheng early education
Astronomical Observatory	靈台	3	Leo		The sky observatory
Junior Officers	少微	4	Leo / Leo Minor		State official
Long Wall	長垣	4	Leo		Border wall
Three Steps	三台	6	Ursa Major	Consists of : The First Upper Step (上台一) → 1st star; The Second Upper Step (上台二) → 2nd star; The First Middle Step (中台一) → 3rd star; The Second Middle Step (中台二) → 4th star; The First Lower Step (下台一) → 5th star; The Second Lower Step (下台二) → 6th star	Three rank official, or triple deck room in the heaven

== See also ==
- Twenty-eight mansions
