= List of nearest stars by spectral type =

Below there are lists the nearest stars separated by spectral type. The scope of the list is still restricted to the common main sequence spectral types: M, K, G, F, A, B and O. It may be later expanded to other types, such as S, D or C.

The Alpha Centauri star system is the closest star system to the Sun.

== List of nearest M-type stars ==
This is a list of M-type stars within 13 light years.

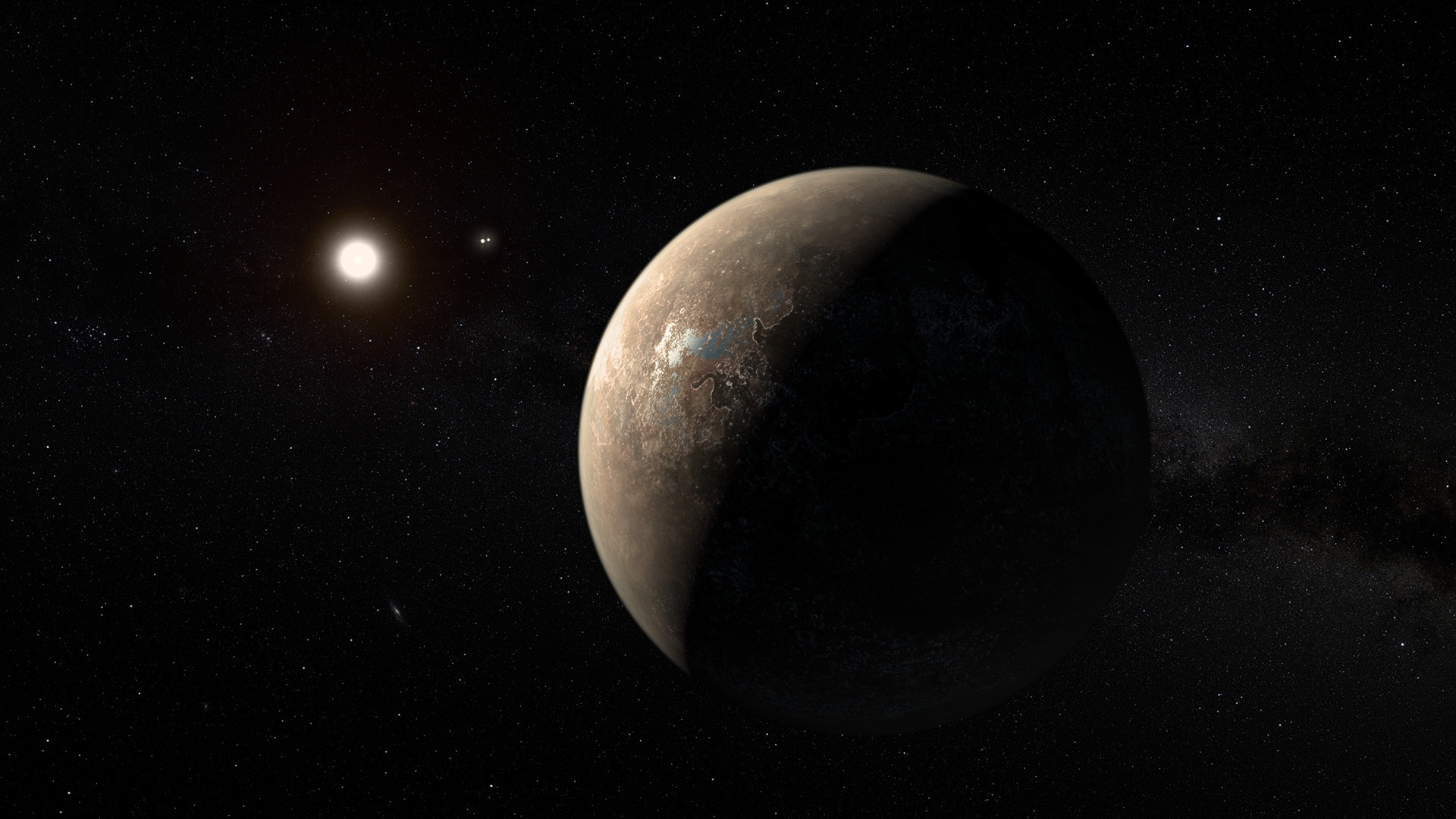
Proxima Centauri is the closest M-type star to the Earth.

| Name | | Distance (ly) | Spectral type | Stellar radius (R_{☉}) | Stellar mass (M_{☉}) | Apparent magnitude (V) | Absolute magnitude (V) | Notes |
|---|---|---|---|---|---|---|---|---|
| Proxima Centauri | | 4.24265±0.0003 | M5.5Ve | 0.1542 ± 0.0045 | 0.1221±0.0022 | 10.43 – 11.1 | 15.6 | Also the nearest star to the Solar System. |
| Barnard's Star | | 5.9629±0.0004 | M4.0V | 0.187±0.001 | 0.161 | 9.511 | 13.21 | Also the second-nearest stellar system to the Solar System. Has four confirmed planets and has the highest apparent motion among all stars in the night sky. |
| Wolf 359 | | 7.856±0.001 | M6V | 0.144±0.004 | 0.11±0.003 | 13.507 | 16.614 | Also the fourth-nearest stellar system to the Solar System. |
| Lalande 21185 | | 8.0344±0.0007 | M2V | 0.392±0.004 | 0.389±0.008 | 7.52 | 10.48 | Also the fifth-nearest stellar system to our Solar System. |
| Luyten 726-8 | B | 8.77±0.01 | M6V | 0.159±0.006 | 0.116±0.002 | 12.8 | 15.7 | Also known as UV Ceti. |
| Luyten 726-8 | A | 8.77±0.01 | M5.5V | 0.165±0.006 | 0.122±0.002 | 12.8 | | The archetype of the flare stars. Also known as BL Ceti |
| Ross 154 | | 9.7063±0.0009 | M3.5V | 0.200±0.008 | 0.177±0.004 | 10.44 | 13.07 | |
| Ross 248 | | 10.306±0.001 | M6V | 0.19 | 0.145 | 12.23 – 12.34 | 14.79 | |
| Lacaille 9352 | | 10.7241±0.0007 | M0.5V | 0.474±0.008 | 0.479^{+0.011}_{−0.010} | 7.34 | 9.8 | |
| Ross 128 | | 11.007±0.001 | M4V | 0.198±0.007 | 0.176±0.004 | 11.13 | 13.53 | |
| EZ Aquarii | A | 11.11 | M5V | 0.175 | 0.1187±0.0011 | 13.03 | 15.33 | |
| EZ Aquarii | B | 11.11 | M5V | 0.21±0.04 | 0.1145±0.0012 | 13.27 | 15.58 | |
| EZ Aquarii | C | 11.11 | M5V | | 0.093 | 12.38 | 17.37 | |
| Struve 2398 | A | 11.4908±0.0009 | M3V | 0.354±0.003 | 0.336±0.007 | 8.94 | | |
| Struve 2398 | B | 11.491±0.001 | M3.5V | 0.273±0.011 | 0.248±0.235 | 9.7 | | |
| Groombridge 34 | A | 11.6191±0.0008 | M1.4V | 0.385±0.002 | 0.393^{+0.009}_{−0.008} | 8.119 | | |
| Groombridge 34 | B | 11.620±0.001 | M4.1V | 0.18±0.03 | 0.15±0.02 | 11.007 | | |
| DX Cancri | | 11.680±0.003 | M6.5V | 0.11 | 0.09 | 14.81 | 16.98 | |
| GJ 1061 | | 11.984±0.001 | M5.5V | 0.152±0.007 | 0.125±0.003 | 13.03 | 15.26 | |
| YZ Ceti | | 12.122±0.002 | M4Ve | 0.168±0.009 | 0.13±0.013 | 12.03—12.18 | 14.3 | |
| Luyten's Star | | 12.348±0.002 | M3.5V | 0.293±0.007 | 0.29 | 9.87 | 11.94 | |
| Teegarden's Star | | 12.497±0.004 | M7V | 0.120±0.012 | 0.097±0.010 | 15.13 | 17.2 | |
| Kapteyn's Star | | 12.8308±0.0008 | M1.5V or sdM1 | 0.291±0.025 | 0.281±0.014 | 8.853±0.008 | 10.89 | |
| Lacaille 8760 | | 12.947±0.002 | M0Ve | 0.51 | 0.6 | 6.67 | 8.69 | Brightest red dwarf in the sky. |

== List of nearest K-type stars ==
This is a list of K-type stars within 30 light years.

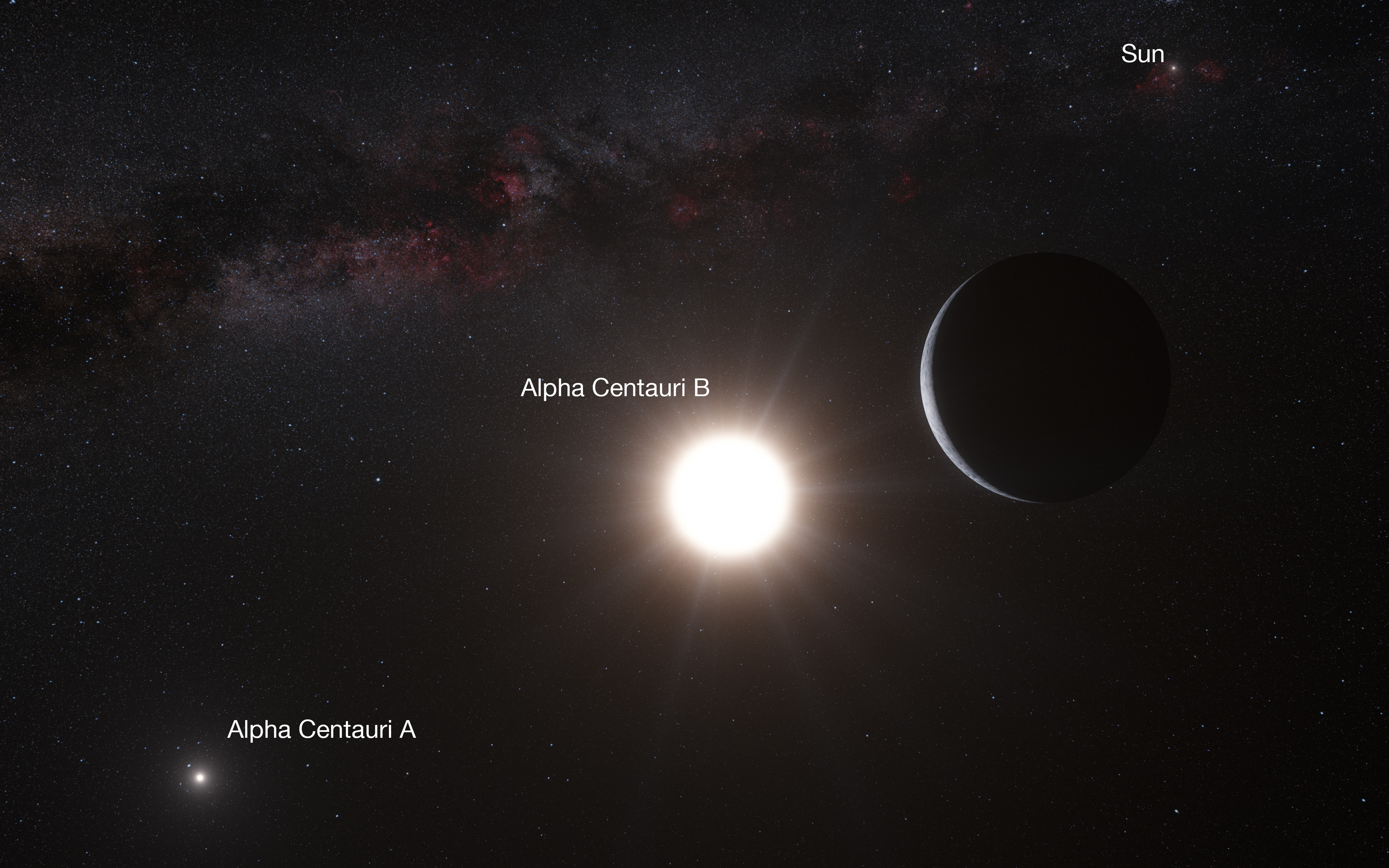
Alpha Centauri B is the closest K-type star to the Earth.

| Name | | Distance (ly) | Spectral type | Stellar radius (R_{☉}) | Stellar mass (M_{☉}) | Apparent magnitude (V) | Absolute magnitude (V) | Notes |
|---|---|---|---|---|---|---|---|---|
| Alpha Centauri B (Toliman) | | 4.344±0.002 | K1V | 0.8591±0.0036 | 0.9092±0.0025 | 1.33 | 5.71 | Also the 2nd/3rd nearest individual star to the Solar System. Named Toliman. |
| Epsilon Eridani (Ran) | | 10.475±0.004 | K2V | 0.735±0.005 | 0.82±0.02 | 3.736 | 6.19 | Also the tenth-nearest star system to our Solar System. Has one confirmed exoplanet |
| 61 Cygni | A | 11.404±0.001 | K5V | 0.665±0.005 | 0.7 | 5.21 | 7.506 | The first star to have its distance to Earth measured after the Sun. Also the 15th nearest stellar system to our solar system. |
| 61 Cygni | B | 11.404±0.001 | K7V | 0.595±0.008 | 0.63 | 6.05 | 8.228 | The first star to have its distance to Earth measured after the Sun. Also the 15th nearest stellar system to our solar system. |
| Epsilon Indi A | | 11.867±0.004 | K5V | 0.711 ± 0.005 | 0.754±0.038 | 4.674 | 6.89 | Also the 19th nearest star system to our Solar System. Has one confirmed exoplanet and two brown dwarfs. |
| Groombridge 1618 | | 15.886±0.002 | K7.5Ve | 0.605±0.02 | 0.67±0.033 | 6.6 | 8.11 | |
| 40 Eridani A (Keid) | | 16.340±0.010 | K0.5V | 0.804±0.006 | 0.78±0.08 | 4.43 | 5.93 | Part of a triple star system |
| 70 Ophiuchi | A | 16.68±0.02 | K0V | 0.831±0.004 | 0.834±0.055 | 4.13 | 5.49 | |
| 70 Ophiuchi | B | 16.707±0.009 | K4V | 0.670±0.009 | 0.782±0.064 | 6.07 | | |
| Sigma Draconis (Alsafi) | | 18.799±0.008 | K0V | 0.776±0.008 | 0.85^{+0.01}_{−0.03} | 4.674 | 5.89 | |
| Gliese 570 A | | 19.199±0.007 | K4V | 0.715±0.009 | 0.82±0.04 | 5.72 | 6.89 | Part of a quadruple star system |
| Eta Cassiopeiae B | | 19.331±0.002 | K7V | 0.57+0.02 −0.03 | 0.5487±0.0056 | 7.51 | | Part of a binary star system |
| 36 Ophiuchi | A (Guniibuu) | 19.41±0.02 | K2V | 0.817±0.016 | 0.75+0.02 −0.04 | 5.08 | | Also known as Guniibuu |
| 36 Ophiuchi | B | 19.40±0.01 | K1V | 0.721±0.044 | 0.76+0.03 −0.06 | 5.03 | | |
| 36 Ophiuchi | C | 19.418±0.004 | K5V | 0.688±0.064 | 0.72±0.01 | 6.34 | | |
| HR 7703 A | | 19.61±0.01 | K2.5V | 0.66 | 0.65 | 5.31 | 6.53 | Part of a binary system |
| ADS 7251 B | | 20.658±0.003 | K7V | 0.58 ± 0.03 | 0.64 ± 0.07 | 7.7 | | Part of a binary star system |
| HD 219134 | | 21.336±0.007 | K3V | 0.778 ± 0.005 | 0.81 ± 0.03 | 5.574 | 6.46 | Has six known exoplanets |
| Xi Boötis B | | 23.011±0.008 | K4Ve | 0.61 | 0.66 ± 0.07 | 6.8 | | Part of a binary star system |
| 268 G. Ceti A | | 23.58±0.05 | K3V | 0.730+0.023 −0.022 | 0.782+0.019 −0.018 | 5.83 | 6.5 | Part of a trinary stellar system also known as Gliese 105 |
| Gliese 667 | A | 23.6±0.1 | K3V | 0.76 | 0.73 | 5.91 | | Part of a triple star system |
| Gliese 667 | B | 23.6±0.1 | K5V | 0.7 | 0.69 | 7.2 | | Part of a triple star system |
| HD 4628 | | 24.25±0.01 | K2.5V | 0.749 ± 0.051 | 0.7 ± 0.1 | 5.74 | 6.37 | |
| TW Piscis Austrini | | 24.793±0.005 | K5Vp | 0.629 ± 0.051 | 0.725 ± 0.036 | 5.44 – 6.51 | 7.08 | Also known as Fomalhaut B. Part of a triple star system |
| 107 Piscium | | 24.8±0.03 | K1V | 0.82 ± 0.03 | 0.86 | 5.14 — 5.26 | 5.87 | |
| Gliese 673 | | 25.157±0.003 | K7V | 0.564 | | 7.492 | 8.83 | |
| p Eridani | A | 26.710±0.008 | K2V | 0.75 | 0.78 | 5.76 | 6.25 | |
| p Eridani | B | 26.733±0.007 | K2V | 0.77 | 0.77 | 5.87 | 6.27 | |
| Gliese 884 | | 26.85 | K7V | 0.67 | 0.63 | 7.9 | 8.3 | |
| Chi Draconis B | | 27.17±0.03 | K0V | 0.73 ± 0.11 | 0.748 ± 0.017 | 3.57 (combined) | | Part of a binary star system |
| HD 50281 | | 28.54±0.01 | K3.5V | 0.73+0.01 −0.02 | 0.79 | 6.58 | 6.87 | |
| HD 192310 | | 28.74±0.01 | K2+ V | 0.79 – 0.85 | 0.78 ± 0.04 | 5.73 | 6.0 | |
| HR 1614 | | 28.845±0.006 | K3V | 0.78+0.03 −0.02 | 0.838+0.034 −0.033 | 6.208 | 6.51 | |
| AK Leporis | | 29±0.004 | K2V | 0.8 | | 6.141 | 6.31 | |
| Delta Eridani (Rana) | | 29.49±0.08 | K0 IV | 2.35 ± 0.01 | 1.33 ± 0.07 | 3.51 – 3.56 | 3.77 | |

== List of nearest G-type stars ==
This is a list of G-type stars within 40 light years.

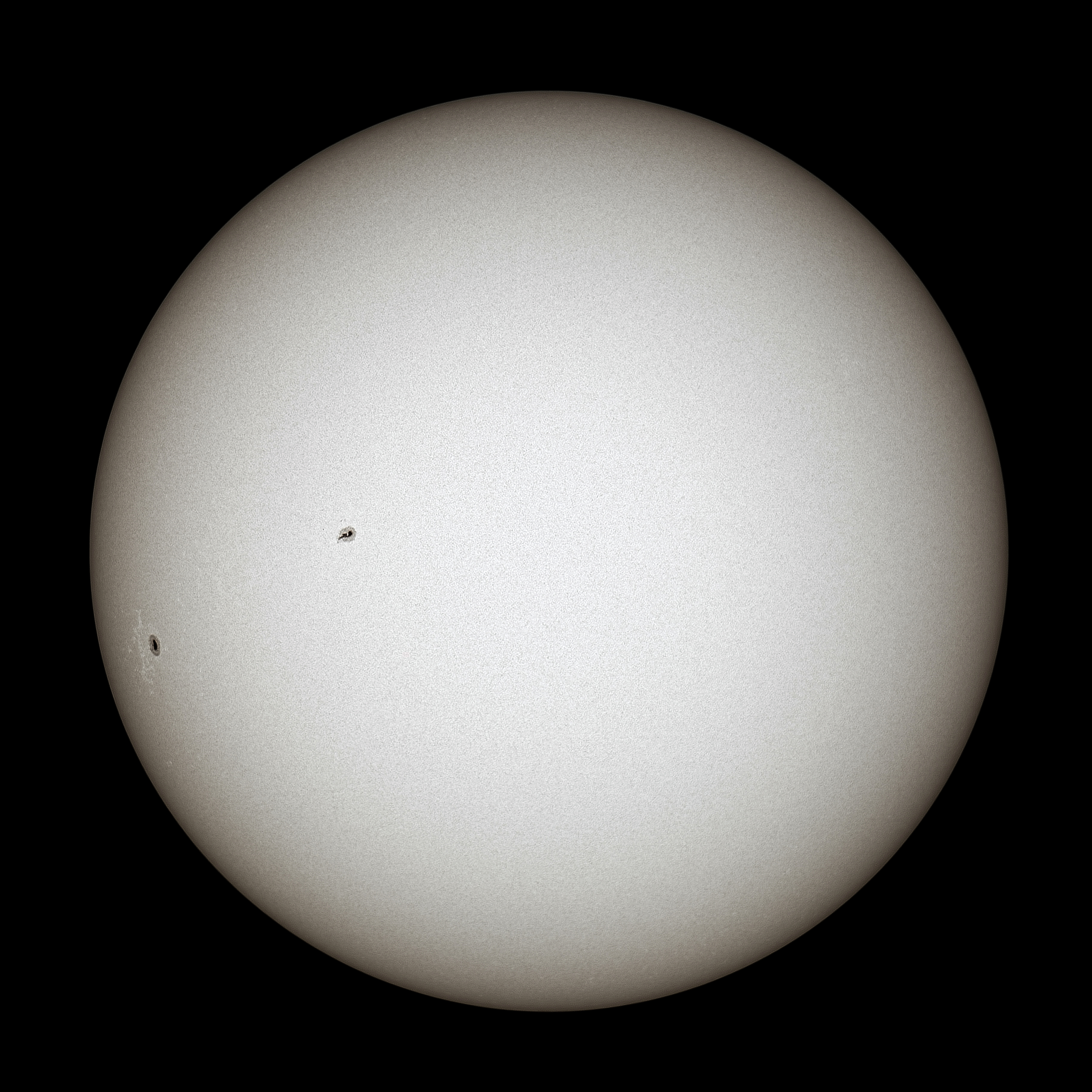
The Sun is the closest G-type star to the Earth.

| Name | | Distance (ly) | Spectral type | Stellar radius (R_{☉}) | Stellar mass (M_{☉}) | Apparent magnitude (V) | Absolute magnitude (V) | Notes |
|---|---|---|---|---|---|---|---|---|
| Sun | | 1.58 × 10^{−5} (149,600,000 km) | G2V | 1 | | -26.74 | 4.83 | The star at the centre of the Solar System. |
| Alpha Centauri A (Rigil Kentaurus) | | 4.344±0.002 | G2V | 1.2175±0.0055 | 1.0788±0.0029 | 0.01 | 4.38 | It is the 2nd/3rd nearest individual star to the Solar System, and the fourth-brightest individual star in the night sky. |
| Tau Ceti | | 11.912±0.007 | G8V | 0.793 ± 0.004 | 0.800 ± 0.008 | 3.5 | 5.68 | Also the 20th nearest star system to the Solar System. |
| Eta Cassiopeiae A (Achird) | | 19.42 | G0V | 1.0386 ± 0.0038 | 0.972 ± 0.012 | 3.44 | 4.57 | Part of a binary star system |
| 82 G. Eridani | | 19.704±0.009 | G6V | 0.93±0.03 | 0.79±0.01 | 4.254 | 5.34 | |
| Delta Pavonis | | 19.89 | G8 IV | 1.197±0.016 | 1.07±0.01 | 3.56 | 4.62 | The nearest undisputed subgiant. |
| Xi Boötis A | | 22.027 | G8Ve | 0.817 ± 0.007 | 0.88 ± 0.03 | 4.7 | 5.54 | Part of a binary star system |
| Beta Hydri | | 24.33 | G2 IV | 1.831 ± 0.009 | 1.107 ± 0.009 | 2.8 | 3.45 | |
| Mu Cassiopeiae Aa (Marfak) | | 25.03±0.08 | G5Vb | 0.789 ± 0.008 | 0.744 ± 0.0122 | 5.14 | 5.78 | Part of a binary star system |
| Mu Herculis Aa | | 27.11±0.04 | G5IV | 1.73 ± 0.02 | 1.11 ± 0.01 | 3.417 | 3.82 | Part of a quadruple star system |
| Beta Canum Venaticorum (Chara) | | 27.63±0.04 | G0V | 1.03 ± 0.03 | 0.97 ± 0.04 | 4.25 | 4.64 | |
| 61 Virginis | | 27.84±0.03 | G7V | 0.9867 ± 0.0048 | 0.93 | 4.74 | 5.07 | Has three confirmed exoplanets |
| Chi^{1} Orionis A | | 28.26±0.07 | G0V | 0.983 ± 0.001 | 1.01 | 4.38 – 4.41 | 4.82 | |
| 41 G. Arae A | | 28.67±0.02 | G8V | 0.79 | 0.81 | 5.61 | 5.74 | Part of a binary star system |
| Xi Ursae Majoris Ba | | 29 | G2V | 0.92 ± 0.04 | 0.86 | 4.264 | 4.66 (Note: Calculated from the bolometric magnitude 4.54 ± 0.06 and the bolometric correction −0.12 ± 0.05 using the formula: BC = Mbol − MV) | Part of a quadruple star system |
| Groombridge 1830 (Argelander's Star) | | 29.93 | G8VIp | 0.585 ± 0.004 | 0.67±0.006 | 6.44 | 6.64 | |
| Beta Comae Berenices | | 29.95±0.1 | G0V | 1.14 ± 0.02 | 1.15 | 4.26 | 4.46 | |
| HD 102365 A | | 30.4±0.02 | G2V | 0.96 | 0.889 | 4.88 | 5.07 | Part of a binary star system |
| 61 Ursae Majoris | | 31.24±0.04 | G8V | 0.86 ± 0.02 | 0.93 ± 0.02 | 5.35 | 5.53 | |
| Alpha Mensae A (Hoerikwaggo) | | 33.31±0.02 | G7V | 0.96 ± 0.013 | 0.964 ± 0.037 | 5.09 | 5.03 | Part of a binary star system |
| Iota Persei | | 34.38±0.08 | G0V or F9.5V | 1.417 ± 0.008 | 1.08 – 1.13 | 4.062 | 3.94 | |
| Zeta Herculis B | | 35±0.2 | G7V | 0.915 – 0.92 | 0.98 ± 0.02 | 2.81 (combined) | 2.65 (combined) | Part of a binary star system |
| Delta Trianguli A (Deltoton) | | 35.2±0.1 | G0V | 0.98 | | 4.865 | 4.69 | Part of a binary star system |
| 11 Leonis Minoris A | | 36.54±0.08 | G8V | 0.992 ± 0.015 | 0.936 ± 0.015 | 5.54 | 5.25 | Part of a binary star system |
| Eta Boötis A (Muphrid) | | 37.2±0.5 | G0IV | 2.659 ± 0.044 | 1.61 ± 0.11 | 2.68 | 2.41 | Part of a binary star system |
| Lambda Serpentis | | 38.87±0.07 | G0V | 1.363 ± 0.031 | 1.09 ± 0.04 | 4.43 | 4.01 | |
| Zeta Reticuli | A | 39.27±0.03 | G3-5V | 0.92±0.02 | 0.95^{+0.02}_{−0.01} | 5.52 | 5.11 | |
| Zeta Reticuli | B | 39.29±0.09 | G2V | 0.98±0.03 | 0.91±0.05 | 5.22 | 4.83 | |
| 85 Pegasi A | | 39.5±0.4 | G5Vb | 0.948 ± 0.011 | 0.827 ± 0.047 | 5.75 | 5.32 | Part of a binary star system |

== List of nearest F-type stars ==
This is a list of F-type stars within 50 light years.

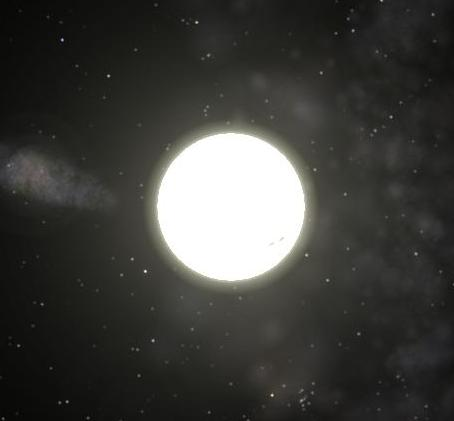
Procyon A is the closest F-type star to the Earth.

| Name | | Distance (ly) | Spectral type | Stellar radius (R_{☉}) | Stellar mass (M_{☉}) | Apparent magnitude (V) | Absolute magnitude (V) | Notes |
|---|---|---|---|---|---|---|---|---|
| Procyon A | | 11.46±0.05 | F5IV-V | 2.048±0.025 | 1.499±0.031 | 0.34 | 2.66 | Part of a binary star system. Eighth-brightest star in the night sky. |
| Pi^{3} Orionis (Tabit) | | 26.32±0.04 | F6V | 1.317±0.004 | 1.288±0.019 | 3.16 | 3.65 | |
| Chi Draconis A | | 27.17±0.03 | F7V | 1.2±0.09 | 1.029±0.06 | 3.57 | 4.04 | Part of a binary system |
| Zeta Tucanae | | 28.01±0.04 | F9.5V | 1.044±0.010 | 0.985±0.033 | 4.23 | 4.67 | |
| Xi Ursae Majoris A (Alula Australis) | | 28.5±0.1 | F8.5:V | 1.02±0.04 | 0.97 | 4.264 | 4.66 (Note: Calculated from the bolometric magnitude 4.54 ± 0.06 and the bolometric correction −0.12 ± 0.05 using the formula: BC = M_{bol} − M_{V}) | Part of a five-star system |
| Gamma Leporis | | 29.12±0.05 | F6V | 1.30±0.03 | 1.17^{+0.10}_{−0.06} | 3.587 | 3.84 | |
| Gamma Pavonis | | 30.21±0.05 | F9 V Fe-1.4 CH-0.7 | 1.057±0.012 | 0.934±0.033 | 4.22 | 4.40 | |
| Zeta Herculis A (Tianji) | | 35±0.2 | F9IV | 2.76±0.02 | 1.45±0.1 | 2.81 | 2.65 | |
| Beta Virginis (Zavijava) | | 35.65±0.09 | F9V | 1.681±0.008 | 1.413±0.061 | 3.604 | 3.41 | |
| Theta Persei A | | 36.29±0.09 | F8V | 1.319±0.011 | 1.138±0.01 | 4.11 | 3.88 | |
| Gamma Serpentis (Muning) | | 36.7±0.07 | F6V | 1.461±0.007 | 1.3±0.15 | 3.85 | 3.60 | |
| Zeta Doradus A | | 37.91±0.07 | F9.5V Fe-0.5 | 1.10±0.02 | 1.07 | 4.708 | 4.38 | |
| Gamma Virginis (Porrima) | A | 38.1±0.3 | F0V | 1.45 | 1.4±0.05 | 3.4 | 3 | |
| Gamma Virginis (Porrima) | B | 38.1±0.3 | F0V | 1.45 | 1.4±0.05 | 3.5 | 3.1 | |
| Iota Pegasi A (Jiu) | | 38.5±0.2 | F5V | 1.526±0.068 | 1.33 | 3.84 | 3.49 | |
| Zeta Trianguli Australis A | | 39.5±0.2 | F9V | 1.02±0.02 | 1.12 | 4.90 | 4.49 | Part of a binary star system |
| Beta Trianguli Australis | | 40.37±0.08 | F1V | 1.976±0.021 | 1.56 | 2.85 | 2.37 | |
| 36 Ursae Majoris A | | 42.22±0.04 | F8V | 1.105±0.020 | 1.113±0.022 | 4.82 | 4.29 | |
| Theta Ursae Majoris | | 43.96±0.08 | F6IV | 2.41±0.02 | 1.41 | 3.18 | 2.43 | |
| Upsilon Andromedae A (Titawin) | | 44±0.1 | F8V | 1.57±0.03 | 1.27±0.06 | 4.10 | 3.44 | |
| Iota Piscium | | 44.53±0.10 | F7V | 1.588±0.014 | 1.135±0.015 | 4.12 | 3.43 | |
| 10 Tauri | | 45.5±0.3 | F8V | 1.622±0.004 | 1.139±0.016 | 4.29 | 3.60 | |
| Alpha Fornacis A (Dalim) | | 45.66±0.08 | F8IV | 2.04±0.06 | 1.33±0.01 | 3.98 | 3.08 | Part of a triple star system |
| 26 Draconis A | | 46.3±0.2 | F9V | | 1.30 | 5.236 (combined) | 4.58 (combined) | Part of a binary star system |
| Tau^{1} Eridani | | 46.56±0.11 | F7V | 1.325 | 1.15 | 4.46 | 3.68 | Part of a binary star system |
| Theta Boötis A | | 47.2±0.1 | F7V | 1.726±0.012 | 1.232±0.012 | 4.05 | 3.25 | Part of a binary star system |
| 111 Tauri | | 47.55±0.07 | F8V | 1.67±0.06 | 1.14 | 5.006 | 4.19 | Part of a binary star system |
| Psi Capricorni | | 47.7±0.1 | F5V | 1.472 | 1.37 | 4.122 | 3.33 | |
| Eta Leporis | | 48.5±0.2 | F2V | 1.52 | 1.42 | 3.72 | 2.85 | |
| HD 84117 | | 48.77±0.08 | F9V | 1.226 | 1.15 | 4.94 | 4.04 | |
| Alchiba | | 48.8±0.1 | F1V | 1.42±0.03 | 1.34+0.04 −0.06 | 4.03 | 3.25 | Part of a binary star system |
| Nu Phoenicis | | 49.77±0.05 | F9VFe+0.4 | 1.26±0.04 | 1.17 | 4.95 | 4.07 | |
| 19 Draconis A | | 49.8±0.3 | F8V | 1.2 | 1.04 | 4.89 | 3.98 | Part of a binary star system |

== List of nearest A-type stars ==
This is a list of A-type stars within 70 light years.

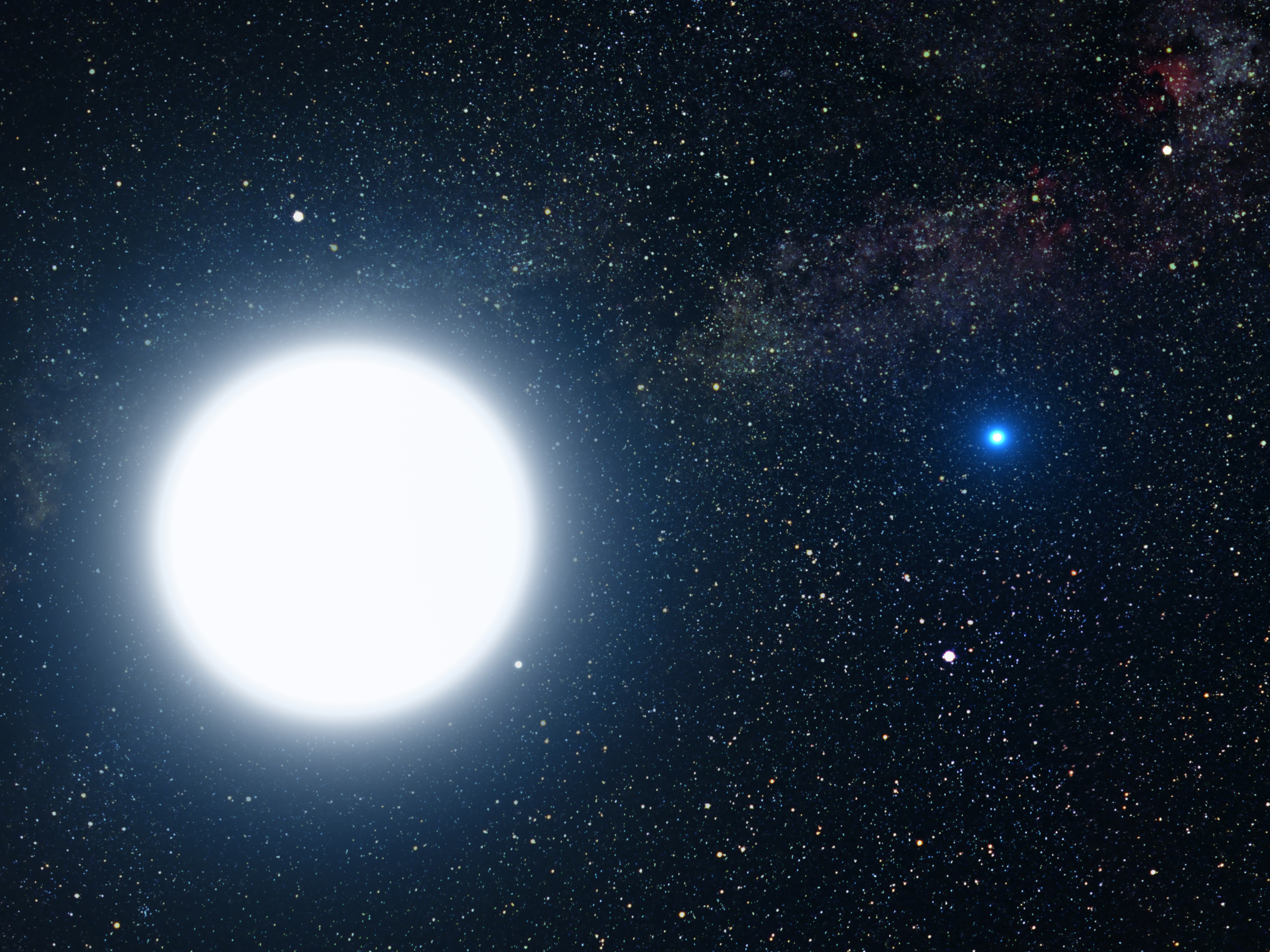
Sirius A is the closest A-type star to the Earth.

| Name | | Distance (ly) | Spectral type | Stellar radius (R_{☉}) | Stellar mass (M_{☉}) | Apparent magnitude (V) | Absolute magnitude (V) | Notes |
|---|---|---|---|---|---|---|---|---|
| Sirius A | | 8.6±0.04 | A0mA1Va | 1.711 | 2.063 ± 0.023 | −1.46 | 1.43 | Also the sixth-nearest stellar system to the Solar System and the brightest star in the night sky. |
| Altair | | 16.7 | A7Vn | 2.01 × 1.57 | 1.86 ± 0.03 | 0.76 | 2.22 | 12th brightest star in the night sky. |
| Vega | | 25.04±0.07 | A0Va | 2.726 × 2.418 | 2.135 ± 0.074 | 0.026 | 0.582 | Fifth-brightest star in the night sky. |
| Fomalhaut A | | 25.13±0.09 | A3V | 1.842 ± 0.019 | 1.92 ± 0.02 | 1.16 | 1.72 | 18th brightest star in the night sky. Part of a triple star system. |
| Denebola | | 35.9±0.2 | A3Va | 1.75±0.02 | 1.78 | 2.14 | 1.93 | |
| Delta Capricorni (Deneb Algedi) | | 38.7±0.09 | A7m III | 1.91 | 2 | 2.81 | 2.48 | Part of a binary star system |
| Iota Ursae Majoris A (Talitha) | | 47.3±0.1 | A7V(n) | 1.67 | 1.7 ± 0.1 | 3.14 | 2.31 | Part of a quadruple star system |
| Alpha Ophiuchi A (Rasalhague) | | 48.6±0.8 | A5IVnn | 2.858 × 2.388 | 2.4+0.23 −0.37 | 2.07 | 1.248 | Part of a binary star system. |
| Alderamin | | 49.05±0.08 | A8Vn or A7IV-V | 2.823 × 2.175 | 2 ± 0.15 | 2.46 | 1.57 | |
| Castor | Aa | 49.15±0.03 | A1V | 2.089±0.005 | 2.371±0.015 | 1.93 | 0.986 | Part of a sextuple star system. |
| Castor | Ba | 49.15±0.03 | Am | 1.648±0.011 | 1.789±0.016 | 2.97 | 1.886 | Part of a sextuple star system. |
| Alpha Circini (Xami) | | 54±0.1 | A7Vp | 1.976±0.066 | 1.5–1.7 | 3.18 - 3.21 | 2.18 | |
| Delta Leonis (Zosma) | | 58.4±0.3 | A4V | 2.14±0.04 | 2.2 | 2.56 | 1.29 | |
| Beta Arietis A (Sheratan) | | 58.4±0.3 | A3V | 1.985 (Note: Calculated, using the Stefan-Boltzmann law and the star's effective temperature and luminosity, with respect to the solar nominal effective temperature of 5,772 K: $$\sqrt{\biggl(\frac{5,772}{8,759}\biggr)^4 \cdot 10^{1.32}} = 1.985\ R_\odot.$$) | 2.067 | 2.655 | 1.444 | Part of a binary star system |
| Iota Centauri (Kulou) | | 58.6 | A2V | 1.90±0.05 (Note: Calculated, using the Stefan-Boltzmann law and the star's effective temperature and luminosity, with respect to the solar nominal effective temperature of 5,772 K: $$\sqrt{\biggl(\frac{5,772}{9,160}\biggr)^4 \cdot 10^{1.36}} = 1.9\ R_\odot.$$) | 2.03 ± 0.03 | 2.73 | 1.47 | |
| Beta Pictoris | | 63.4±0.2 | A6V | 1.732±0.123 | 1.75 | 3.861 | 2.402 | Has three known planets |

== List of nearest B-type stars ==
This is a list of B-type stars within 200 light years.

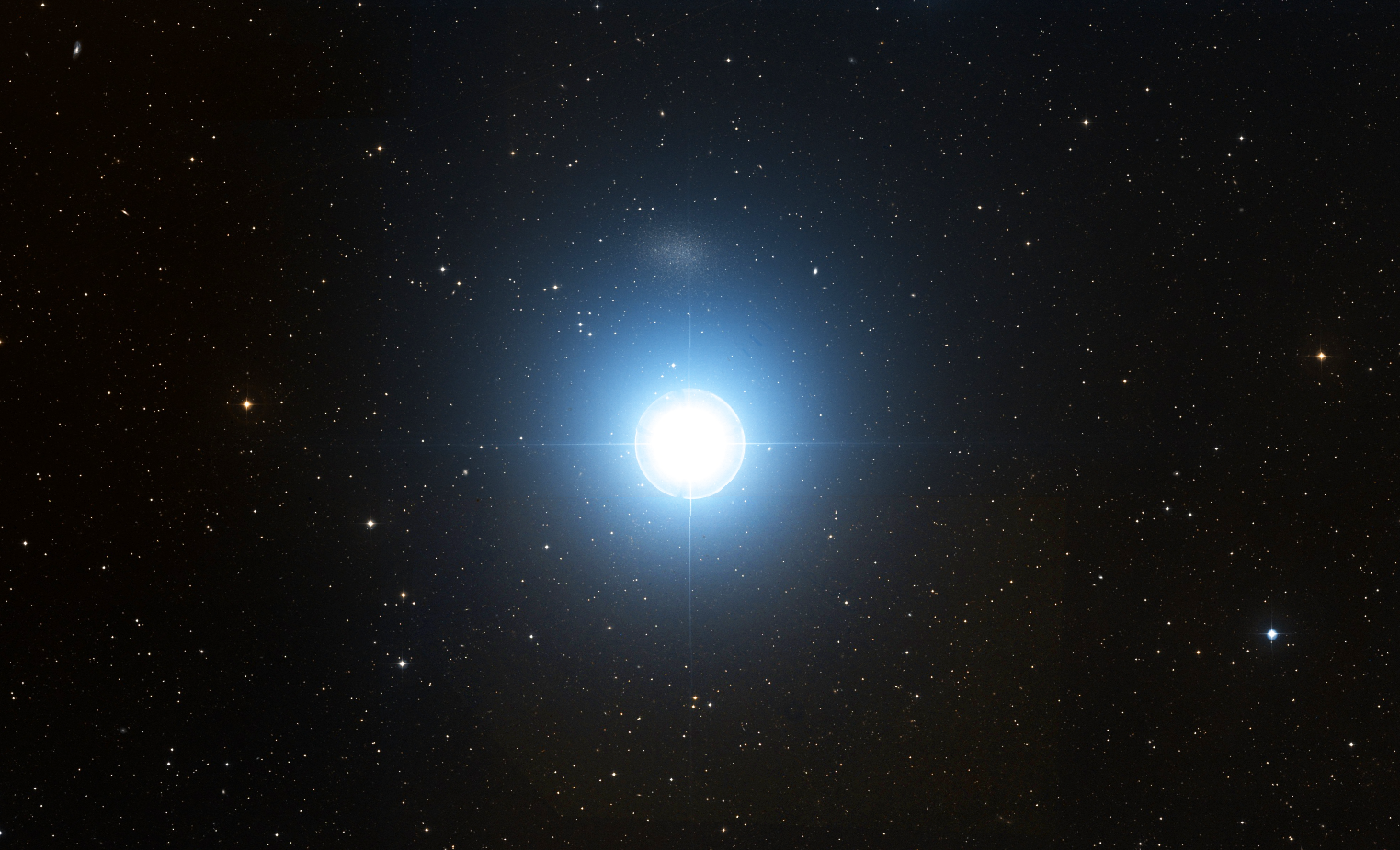
Regulus A is the closest B-type star to the Earth.

| Name | Distance (ly) | Spectral type | Stellar radius (R_{☉}) | Stellar mass (M_{☉}) | Apparent magnitude (V) | Absolute magnitude (V) | Notes |
|---|---|---|---|---|---|---|---|
| Regulus A | 79.3±0.7 | B8IVn | 4.21 × 3.22 | 4.15±0.06 | 1.40 | −0.57 | Part of a binary star system. Also the 20th brightest star in the night sky. |
| Algol Aa1 | 90±3 | B8V | 2.73±0.2 | 3.17±0.21 | 2.12 (combined) | −0.07 | Part of a three-star system |
| Alpheratz A | 97±1 | B8IV-VHgMn | 2.94 ± 0.34 (Note: Applying the Stefan–Boltzmann law with a nominal solar effective temperature of 5,772 K: $$\sqrt{\biggl(\frac{5,772}{11,950}\biggr)^4 \cdot 10^{2.2}} = 2.937\ R_\odot$$.) | 3.63±0.201 | 2.22 | −0.193 | Part of a binary star system |
| Alnair | 101±0.7 | B6V or B7IV | 3.91 (Note: 0.00117 arcseconds*31.1 pc = 0.036387 AU (diameter). Should be multiplied by 107.5 to convert from AU to R_{☉}.) | 3.82 | 1.74 | −0.72 | 31st brightest star in the night sky. |
| Alkaid | 103.9±0.8 | B3V | 3.4±0.5 | 6.1±0.1 | 1.86 | −0.67 | 40th brightest star in the night sky. |
| Alpha Pegasi (Markab) | 133±1 | B9III to A0IV | 4.62±0.29 | 3.5 | 2.48 | −0.718 | |
| Elnath | 134±2 | B7III | 4.79±0.13 | 5±0.1 | 1.65 | −1.42 | 27th brightest star in the night sky. |
| Achernar | 139±3 | B3Vpe | 9.16 × 6.78 | 6 | 0.40 – 0.46 | −2.7 | 9th brightest star in the night sky. |
| Beta^{1} Tucanae | 140±1 | B9V | | 3.84 | 4.37 | | Part of a six-star system |
| Epsilon Sagittarii A (Kaus Australis) | 143±2 | B9.5III | 8.8 × 6.01 | 3.8 | 1.85 | −1.41 | 38th brightest star in the night sky. |
| Epsilon Hydri | 151.8±0.6 | B9Va | 2.2 | 2.64 | 4.12 | 0.78 | |
| Phi Eridani | 153.7±0.9 | B8IV | 2.4 | 3.5 | 3.55 | 0.183±0.027 | |
| Gamma Corvi A (Gienah) | 154±1 | B8III | 4.086 | 4.2^{+0.4}_{−0.3} | 2.585 | −0.79 | |
| Beta Canis Minoris (Gomeisa) | 160±10 | B8Ve | 3.5 | 3.5 | 2.84 – 2.92 | −0.59 | |
| Delta Cygni (Fawaris) | 165±4 | B9III | 4.81±0.36 | 2.93 | 2.87 | −0.74 | |
| Kappa Andromedae (Kaffalmusalsala) | 168±2 | B9IVn | 2.29±0.06 | 2.768^{+0.10}_{−0.11} | 4.139 | 0.59 | Has one confirmed exoplanet or brown dwarf |
| Peacock | 179±5 | B3V | 4.83 | 5.91 | 1.94 | −1.762 | 44th brightest star in the night sky. |
| Kappa^{1} Lupi | 180±5 | B9.5Vne | 2.3 | 2.89±0.03 | 3.86 | | |
| Alpha Sagittarii (Rukbat) | 182±2 | B8V | 2.69 (Note: Radius retrieved multiplying angular diameter to distance; 107.5*0.00048 arcseconds*52.1 pc = 2.69 R_{☉}.) | 2.95 | 3.97 | 0.23 | |
| Beta Librae (Zubeneschamali) | 185±2 | B8V | 4.9 (Note: Calculated using an angular diameter of 0.801 Milliarcseconds.) | 3.5^{+0.3}_{−0.2} | 2.61 | −1.16 | |

== List of nearest O-type stars ==
This is a list of O-type stars within 1,500 light years. Stars with spectra of sdO are subdwarf O stars, much smaller and fainter than typical O-type stars.

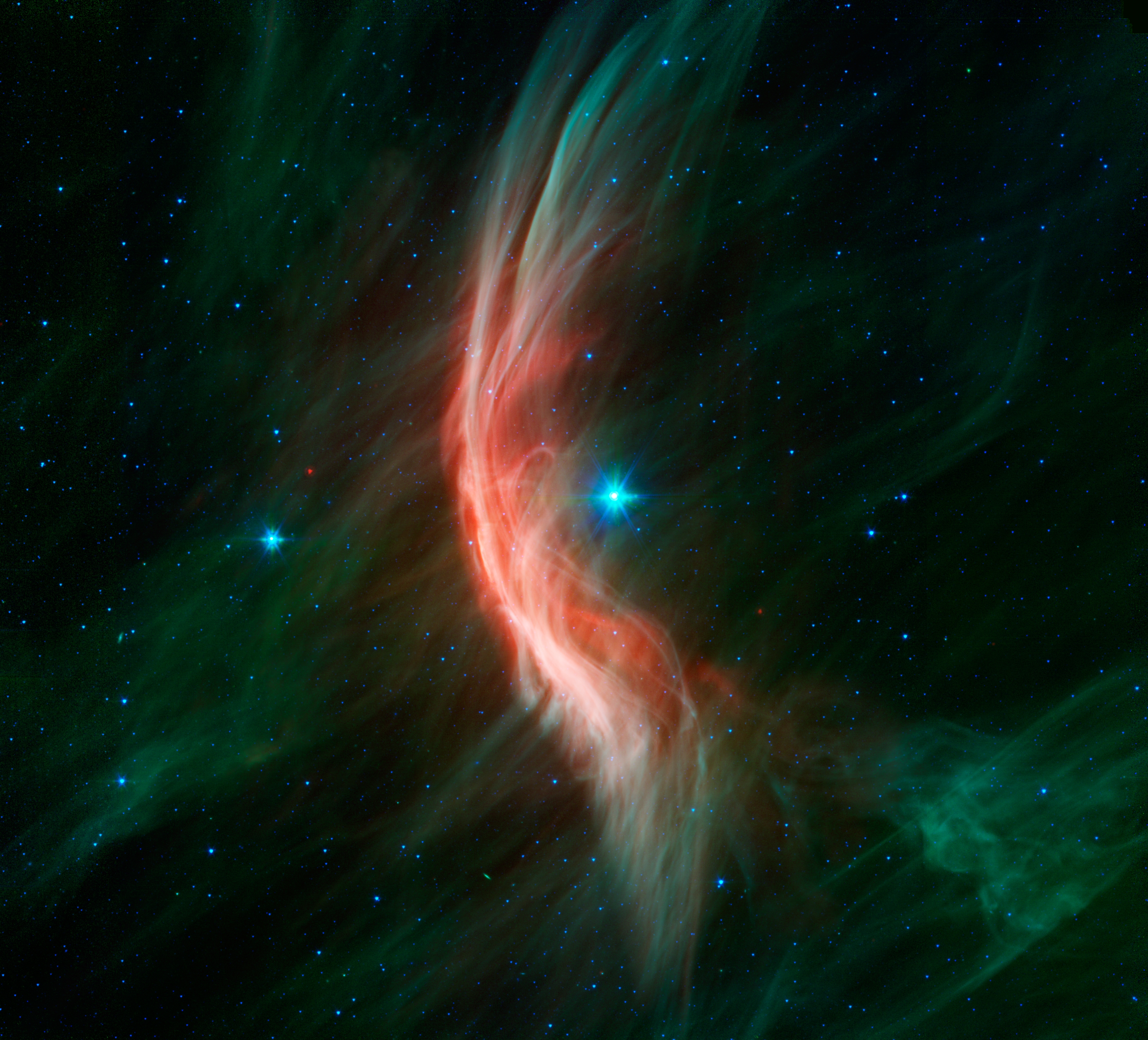
Zeta Ophiuchi is the closest known O-type star to the Earth.

| Name | Distance (ly) | Spectral type | Stellar radius (R_{☉}) | Stellar mass (M_{☉}) | Apparent magnitude (V) | Absolute magnitude (V) | Notes |
|---|---|---|---|---|---|---|---|
| Zeta Ophiuchi | 440±40 | O9.5V | 8.5 | 20.2 | 2.56 – 2.58 | -4.2 | |
| Phi Persei B | 720±30 | sdO | 1.3 | 1.14 | | | |
| 28 Cygni B | 838±24 | sdO | | 0.76±0.28 | | | |
| Iota Arae B | 915±23 | sdO | 0.61±0.09 | 1.06±0.29 | | | |
| V846 Arae B | 985±13 | sdO | 0.27±0.04 | 0.53±0.11 | | | |
| Kappa^{1} Apodis B | 1060±20 | sdO | 0.44±0.06 | 1.60±0.14 | | | |
| Zeta Puppis (Naos) | 1080±40 | O4If(n)p | 13.5±0.2 | 25.3±5.3 | 2.24 – 2.26 | −6.23 | |
| Gamma Velorum A | 1096+26 −23 | O7.5III | 16.2 | 28.5±1.1 | 1.83 (combined) | −5.63 | 30th brightest star in the night sky. |
| Mintaka | 1200 | O9.5II | 13.1 | 17.8 | 2.5 | −5.8 | Part of a multiple star system |
| V2119 Cygni B | 1203±22.3 | sdO | | 1.62±0.28 | | | |
| 60 Cygni B | 1225±57 | sdO | 1.7 | 0.48 | | | |
| Alnitak | 1260±180 | O9.5lab | 20±3.2 | 33±10 | 2.08 | −6 | Part of a triple star system |
| Meissa A | 1260±200 | O8III((f)) | 10.0±0.6 | 34 | 3.7 | | Part of a multiple star system |
| Sigma Orionis Aa | 1263±4.3 | O9.5V | 5.6 | 16 | 4.07 (combined) | −3.49 | Part of a quintuple star system |
| AE Aurigae | 1270±20 | O9.5V | 6.8±0.5 | 19.2±0.3 | 5.96 (5.78 – 6.08) | | |
| Xi Persei (Menkib) | 1333±143 | O7.5III(n)((f)) | 10.1±1.3 | 26—36 | 4.04 | −5.5 | |
| Theta^{1} Orionis C1 | 1340±65 | O7Vp | 10.6±1.5 | 33±5 | 5.13 | −4.9 | Part of a binary star system |
| Iota Orionis Aa1 (Haytsa) | 1343+45.6 −42.3 | O9III | 8.3 | 23.1 | 2.77 (combined) | | Part of a multiple star system |
| LS Muscae B | 1383±43 | sdO | 0.3±0.1 | 1.43±0.31 | | | |
