= 82 G. Eridani =

Star in the constellation Eridanus

- Location of 82 G. Eridani (circled)

Observation data Epoch J2000 Equinox ICRS
- Constellation: Eridanus
- Right ascension: 03^{h} 19^{m} 55.651^{s}
- Declination: −43° 04′ 11.22″
- Apparent magnitude (V): 4.254

Characteristics
- Evolutionary stage: main sequence
- Spectral type: G6 V
- U−B color index: +0.22
- B−V color index: +0.71

Astrometry
Radial velocity (R_{v})	87.76±0.13 km/s
Proper motion (μ)	RA: 3,035.017 mas/yr Dec.: 726.964 mas/yr
Parallax (π)	165.5242±0.0784 mas
Distance	19.704 ± 0.009 ly (6.041 ± 0.003 pc)
Absolute magnitude (M_{V})	5.34

Details
Mass	0.80 M_{☉}
Radius	0.93±0.03 R_{☉}
Luminosity	0.6869±0.0026 L_{☉}
Habitable zone inner limit	0.6322±0.0020 AU
Habitable zone outer limit	1.5236±0.0091 AU
Surface gravity (log g)	4.39±0.03 cgs
Temperature	5,473±48 K
Metallicity [Fe/H]	−0.42±0.02 dex
Rotation	~39 days
Rotational velocity (v sin i)	<2 km/s
Age	9 Gyr

Other designations
- e Eri, 82 G. Eri, CD−43°1028, FK5 119, GJ 139, HD 20794, HIP 15510, HR 1008, SAO 216263, LHS 19, LTT 1583

Database references
SIMBAD	The star
- planet b
- planet c
- planet d
Exoplanet Archive	data
ARICNS	data

82 G. Eridani (HD 20794, Gliese 139, e Eridani) is a star 19.7 light-years (6.0 parsecs) away from Earth in the constellation Eridanus. It is a main-sequence star with a stellar classification of G6 V, and it hosts a system of three confirmed planets and a dust disk.

== Observation ==
In the southern-sky catalog Uranometria Argentina, 82 G. Eridani (often abbreviated to 82 Eridani) is the 82nd star listed in the constellation Eridanus. The Argentina catalog, compiled by the 19th-century astronomer Benjamin Gould, is a southern celestial hemisphere analog of the more famous Flamsteed catalog, and uses a similar numbering scheme.

== Properties ==
82 G. Eridani is slightly smaller and less massive than the Sun, at around 80% of the Sun's mass and 90% of the radius. It has a luminosity 30% fainter than the Sun's. Spectroscopically, it is classified as G6V, compared to G2V for the Sun, and is among the nearest solar-type stars. The projected rotational velocity rate (v sin i) is smaller than 2 km/s, compatible with a slow-rotating or pole-on star relative to Earth. Such observation would also match the lack of a reliable rotational period detection and the absence of any magnetic cycle.

It is a high-velocity star—it is moving quickly compared to the average—and hence is probably a member of Population II, generally older stars whose motions take them well outside the plane of the Milky Way. Like many other Population II stars, 82 G. Eridani is somewhat metal-deficient (though much less deficient than many), and is older than the Sun. It has a relatively high orbital eccentricity of 0.42 about the galaxy, ranging between 3.52 and 8.41 kiloparsecs from the core. At an age of nine billion years, the star is close to the end of its main sequence lifetime.

This star is located in a region of low-density interstellar matter (ISM), so it is believed to have a large astropause that subtends an angle of 6″ across the sky. Relative to the Sun, this star is moving at a space velocity of 101 km/s, with the bow shock advancing at more than Mach 3 through the ISM.

== Planetary system ==
An infrared excess was discovered around the star by the Infrared Space Observatory at 60 μm, but was not later confirmed by the Spitzer Space Telescope, in 2006. However, in 2012, a dust disk was found around the star, by the Herschel Space Observatory. While not well-constrained, if assumed to have a similar composition to 61 Virginis' dust disk, it has a semi-major axis of 24 AU.

On August 17, 2011, European astronomers announced the discovery of three planets orbiting 82 G. Eridani. The mass range of these planets classifies them as super-Earths; objects with only a few times the Earth's mass. These planets were discovered by precise measurements of the radial velocity of the star, with the planets revealing their presence by their gravitational displacement of the star during each orbit. None of the planets display a significant orbital eccentricity. However, their orbital periods are all 90 days or less, indicating that they are orbiting close to the host star. The equilibrium temperature for the most distant planet, based on an assumed Bond albedo of 0.3, would be about 388 K (115 °C); significantly above the boiling point of water.

At the time of planet c's detection, it exerted the lowest gravitational perturbation. There was also a similarity noted between its orbital period and the rotational period of the star. For these reasons the discovery team were somewhat more cautious regarding the verity of its candidate planet status than for the other two. (Indeed this 40-day planet is no longer believed to exist and the "c" designation has been re-used.)

Using the TERRA algorithm, developed by Guillem Anglada-Escudé and R. Paul Butler in 2012, to describe better and filter out noise interference to extract more precise radial velocity measurements, a team of scientists led by Fabo Feng, in 2017, provided evidence for up to three more planets. One such candidate, of Neptune mass, 82 G. Eridani f, may orbit in the habitable zone of the star. The team also believe that, using these noise reduction techniques, they are able to better quantify the descriptions for the earlier 3 exoplanets, but only have weak evidence of 82 G. Eridani c.

A study in 2023 could only confirm planets b & d, and did not significantly detect the other planet candidates. In particular, the statistical significance of planet c would be expected to increase with additional data; the fact that this has not happened casts doubt on its existence. The 40-day radial velocity signal may instead be tied to the stellar rotation. The additional three candidates found in 2017 (e, f, g) could not be confirmed or refuted. Another 2023 study also only confirmed b & d out of the previous planet candidates (referring to them as b & c), but also detected a potential third planet farther from the star than any of the previous candidates, on an eccentric orbit partially within the habitable zone. A 2024 study confirmed this habitable zone planet.

As of 2026, 82 G. Eridani is the nearest G-type main-sequence star that host confirmed exoplanets, while the closer Rigil Kentaurus, Tau Ceti and Achird have exoplanet candidates.

The 82 Eridani planetary system (Note: The Cretignier et al. 2023 and Nari et al. 2025 references used here refer to the 90-day planet as "c" and the new 640-day planet as "d". Previous publications refer to the 90-day planet as "d", with "c" referring to a 40-day candidate that is likely a false positive. Additional candidates found by Feng et al. 2017 are not included here as they are not detected by more recent studies.)
Companion (in order from star)	Mass	Semimajor axis (AU)	Orbital period (days)	Eccentricity	Inclination (°)	Radius
Hot dust	≲0.1 AU				—	—
b	≥2.15±0.17 M_{🜨}	0.12570+0.00052 −0.00053	18.3140±0.0022	0.064+0.065 −0.046	—	—
c	≥2.98±0.29 M_{🜨}	0.3625+0.0015 −0.0016	89.68±0.10	0.077+0.084 −0.055	—	—
d	≥5.82±0.57 M_{🜨}	1.3541±0.0068	647.6+2.5 −2.7	0.45+0.11 −0.10	—	—
Dust disk	22–27 AU				50°	—

=== Potential habitability of 82 G. Eridani d ===
On October 15, 2024, researchers at Oxford University announced that they had confirmed HD 20794 d, orbiting in the habitable zone of its star. In an article published in the journal Astronomy & Astrophysics, scientists said an analysis of 20 years of observational data had found HD 20794 d could be a rocky planet (though its composition is unknown and it could also be a mini-Neptune) and should be "a high-priority target for future atmospheric characterization with direct imaging facilities."

About six times the mass of Earth, the planet orbits "at the right distance from its star to sustain liquid water on its surface — a key ingredient for life as we know it." However, HD 20794 d's orbit is significantly elliptical, meaning it spends part of its year outside the habitable zone. Data for the research was gathered at the High Accuracy Radial Velocity Planet Searcher spectrograph at La Silla Observatory in Chile. With the discovery, HD 20794 d became the 12th-closest potentially habitable planet to Earth.

== Planned observation missions ==
82 G. Eridani (GJ 139) was picked as a Tier 1 target star for NASA's proposed Space Interferometry Mission (SIM) mission to search for terrestrial-sized or larger planets, which was cancelled in 2010.

== See also ==
- 40 Eridani
- p Eridani
- Epsilon Eridani
- Epsilon Indi
- List of nearest stars
- List of nearest G-type stars
