= HR 1614 =

Star in the constellation Eridanus

- Location of HR 1614 (circled in red)

Observation data Epoch J2000 Equinox ICRS
- Constellation: Eridanus
- Right ascension: 05^{h} 00^{m} 48.9993^{s}
- Declination: −05° 45′ 13.224″
- Apparent magnitude (V): 6.208

Characteristics
- Evolutionary stage: main sequence
- Spectral type: K3 V
- U−B color index: +1.00
- B−V color index: +1.06

Astrometry
Radial velocity (R_{v})	+21.0 km/s
Proper motion (μ)	RA: 549.309(21) mas/yr Dec.: −1,108.245(16) mas/yr
Parallax (π)	113.0715±0.0222 mas
Distance	28.845 ± 0.006 ly (8.844 ± 0.002 pc)
Absolute magnitude (M_{V})	6.51

Details
Mass	0.838+0.034 −0.033 M_{☉}
Radius	0.78+0.03 −0.02 R_{☉}
Luminosity	0.302 L_{☉}
Surface gravity (log g)	4.55 cgs
Temperature	4,945±8.7 K
Metallicity [Fe/H]	0.28 dex
Rotation	48.0 days
Rotational velocity (v sin i)	4.1 km/s
Age	2 or 4.5 Gyr

Other designations
- 284 G. Eri, BD−05°1123, GJ 183, HD 32147, HIP 23311, HR 1614, SAO 131688, LHS 200, LPM 200, LTT 2142, PLX 1129

Database references
SIMBAD	data
ARICNS	data

HR 1614 (284 G. Eridani, GJ 183) is a star in the constellation Eridanus. Based upon parallax measurements, it is about 28.8 light-years (8.8 parsecs) distant from the Earth. It is a main sequence star with a stellar classification of K3V. The chromosphere has an effective temperature of about 4,945 K, which gives this star the orange hue characteristic of K-type stars. It has about 84% of the Sun's mass and 78% of the Sun's radius.

It is considered a metal-rich dwarf star, which means it displays an unusually high portion of elements heavier than helium in its spectrum. This metallicity is given in term of the ratio of iron to hydrogen, as compared to the Sun. In the case of HR 1614, this ratio is about 90% higher than the Sun. The activity cycle for this star is 11.1 years in length. Based upon gyrochronology, the estimated age of this star is 4.5 Gyr.

This system is a member of a moving group of at least nine stars that share a common motion through space. The members of this group display the same abundance of heavy elements as does HR 1614, which may indicate a common origin for these stars. The space velocity of this group relative to the Sun is 59 km/s. The estimated age of this group is 2 Gyr, suggesting a corresponding age for this star.

== See also ==
- List of star systems within 25–30 light-years
- List of nearest K-type stars
