= 107 Piscium =

Star in the constellation Pisces

- Location of 107 Piscium (circled in red)

Observation data Epoch J2000.0 Equinox J2000.0 (ICRS)
- Constellation: Pisces
- Right ascension: 01^{h} 42^{m} 29.76349^{s}
- Declination: +20° 16′ 06.6602″
- Apparent magnitude (V): 5.14 to 5.26

Characteristics
- Spectral type: K1V
- U−B color index: +0.49
- B−V color index: +0.84
- V−R color index: 0.5
- R−I color index: +0.43
- Variable type: Constant

Astrometry
| Radial velocity (R_{v}) | −33.619±0.0013 km/s |
| Proper motion (μ) | RA: −301.592 mas/yr Dec.: −674.505 mas/yr |
| Parallax (π) | 131.4903±0.1515 mas |
| Distance | 24.80 ± 0.03 ly (7.605 ± 0.009 pc) |
| Absolute magnitude (M_{V}) | 5.87 |

Details
| Mass | 0.86 M_{☉} |
| Radius | 0.808±0.016 R_{☉} |
| Luminosity (bolometric) | 0.44±0.02 L_{☉} |
| Surface gravity (log g) | 4.53±0.01 cgs |
| Temperature | 5,221±4 K |
| Metallicity [Fe/H] | −0.01±0.07 dex |
| Rotation | 35.0 days |
| Rotational velocity (v sin i) | 2.0±1.0 km/s |
| Age | 6.3 Gyr |

Other designations
- 107 Psc, 2 Arietis, BD+19°279, GC 2080, GJ 68, HD 10476, HIP 7981, HR 493, SAO 74883, PPM 91014, CCDM J01425+2016A, WDS 01425+2016A, LFT 153, LHS 1287, LTT 10596, NLTT 5685

Database references
| SIMBAD | data |
| ARICNS | data |

107 Piscium is a single star in the constellation of Pisces. This star is faintly visible to the naked eye with an apparent visual magnitude that has been measured varying between 5.14 and 5.26. However, that finding of variation was not confirmed by subsequent observations and is most likely spurious data. It is located at a distance of about 24.8 light-years away from the Sun. 107 Piscium is drifting closer to the Sun with a radial velocity of −33.6, and is predicted to come as close as 15.4 light-years in around 135,800 years.

== Nomenclature ==
107 Piscium is the star's Flamsteed designation. John Flamsteed numbered the stars of Pisces from 1 to 113, publishing his Catalogus Britannicus in 1725. He accidentally numbered 107 Piscium twice, as he also allocated it the designation of 2 Arietis.

In Chinese astronomy, this was historically identified as the determinative star of the asterism Yòu Gēng (右更, Official in Charge of Pasturing). Later versions of this asterism identified Rho Piscium as the first star.

== Properties ==
This object is a K-type main-sequence star with a stellar classification of K1V, indicating it is generating energy from core hydrogen fusion. It is somewhat older than the Sun—approximately 6 billion years old. The star has 86% of the mass, 80.8% of the radius of the Sun, shines with 44% of the Sun's luminosity and has an effective temperature of 5,221 K. It is rotating slowly with a period of 35.0 d. The abundance of elements other than hydrogen and helium—the star's metallicity—is slightly lower than that of the Sun. The level of chromospheric activity is similar to the Sun, and it shows a simple cycle of variation.

107 Piscium has been examined for the presence of an infrared excess caused by exozodiacal dust, but none was detected. The habitable zone for this star, defined as the locations where liquid water could be present on an Earth-like planet, is at a radius of 0.52–1.10 Astronomical Units (AU), where 1 AU is the average distance from the Earth to the Sun.

In 1997, based on data collected during the Hipparcos mission, the star was categorized as an astrometric binary with a period of 0.576 years. However, this result has not been confirmed.

== See also ==
- Gliese 67
- Gliese 69
- List of nearest K-type stars
