= HD 10307 =

Binary star system in the constellation Andromeda

- Location of HD 10307 (circled)

Observation data Epoch J2000.0 Equinox ICRS
- Constellation: Andromeda
- Right ascension: 01^{h} 41^{m} 47.1431^{s}
- Declination: +42° 36′ 48.444″
- Apparent magnitude (V): 4.95 / 11

Characteristics
- Spectral type: G1.5 V + M V
- U−B color index: 0.11
- B−V color index: 0.62

Astrometry
Radial velocity (R_{v})	3.1±0.12 km/s
Proper motion (μ)	RA: 813.337±0.380 mas/yr Dec.: −171.027±0.464 mas/yr
Parallax (π)	79.08±0.63 mas
Distance	41.2 ± 0.3 ly (12.6 ± 0.1 pc)
Absolute magnitude (M_{V})	4.43
Absolute bolometric magnitude (M_{bol})	4.32±0.06

Orbit
Period (P)	19.542±0.014 yr
Semi-major axis (a)	0.6104±0.0097″
Eccentricity (e)	0.4367±0.0020
Inclination (i)	100.36±0.89°
Longitude of the node (Ω)	32.25±0.35°
Periastron epoch (T)	2016.702±0.012
Argument of periastron (ω) (secondary)	27.15±0.35°
Semi-amplitude (K_{1}) (primary)	2.7160±0.0072 km/s

Details

HD 10307 A
Mass	0.95±0.11 M_{☉}
Radius	1.14±0.04 R_{☉}
Luminosity	1.44 L_{☉}
Surface gravity (log g)	4.3±0.1 cgs
Temperature	5,878±60 K
Metallicity [Fe/H]	+0.00±0.06 dex
Rotational velocity (v sin i)	1.5±1.0 km/s
Age	7.0 Gyr

HD 10307 B
Mass	0.254±0.019 M_{☉}
Luminosity	0.0013 L_{☉}

Other designations
- BD+41°328, GJ 67, HD 10307, HIP 7918, HR 483, SAO 37434, LHS 1284, YPC 350

Database references
SIMBAD	HD 10307
ARICNS	HD 10307 A
- HD 10307 B

HD 10307 (HR 483) is a spectroscopic binary star in the constellation Andromeda. The primary is similar to the Sun in mass, temperature and metal content. It is situated about 42 light-years from Earth. Its companion, HR 483 B, is a little-studied red dwarf.

HD 10307 was identified in September 2003 by astrobiologist Margaret Turnbull from the University of Arizona in Tucson as one of the most promising nearby candidates for hosting life based on her analysis of the HabCat list of stars.

== System ==
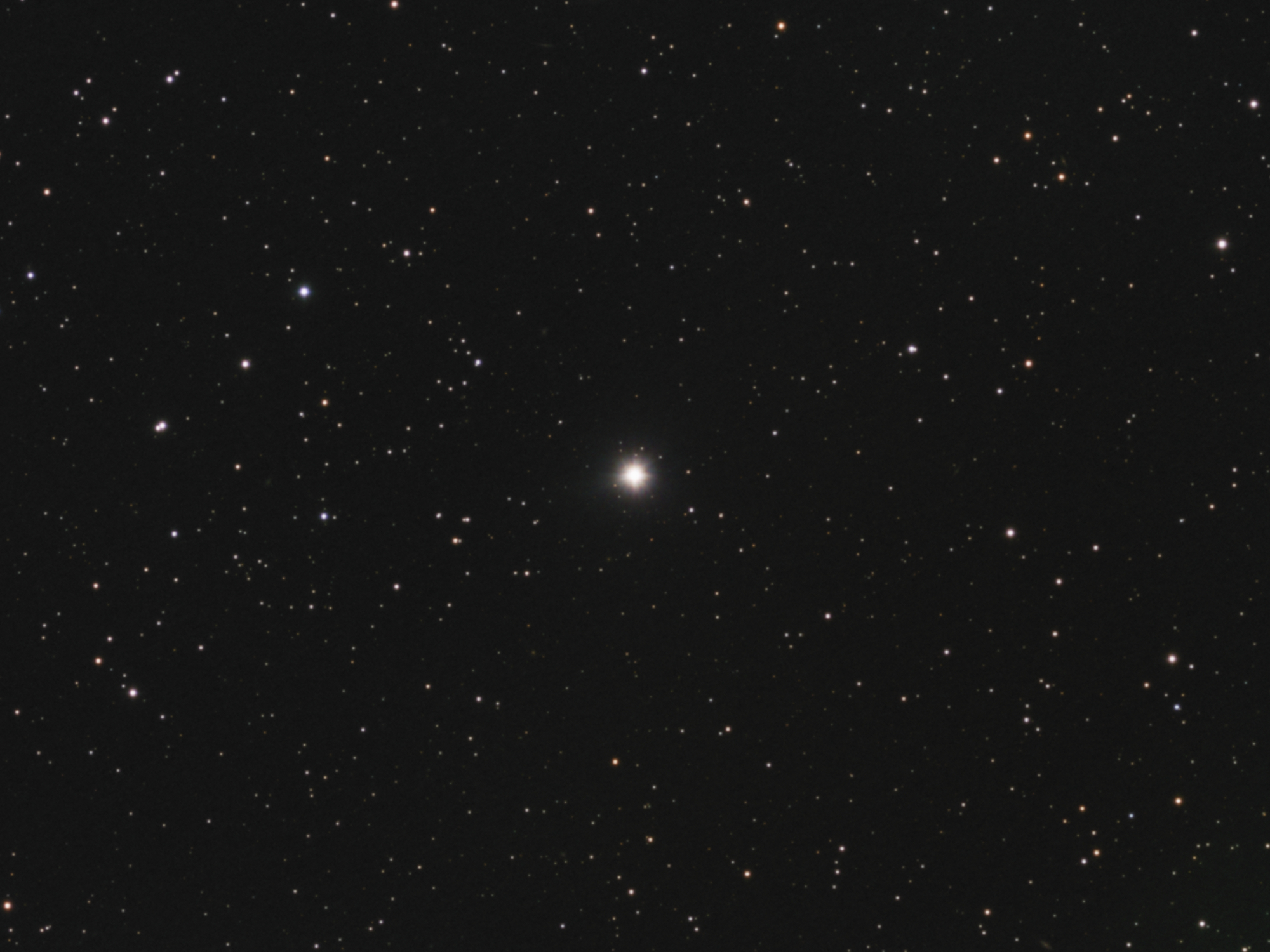
HD 10307 in optical light

HR 483 is a binary located 42.6 ly away, in Andromeda. The two stars orbit one another elliptically (e=0.44), approaching as close as 4.2 AU and receding to 10.5 AU, with a period of just under twenty years.

HD 10307 A, the larger component, is a G-type main-sequence star similar to the Sun, only slightly brighter, hotter, larger, and older than the Sun—though with a slightly smaller mass. It has a low level of activity and is a candidate Maunder minimum analog. HR 483 B, the smaller component, appears to be a red dwarf, with as little as thirty-eight percent the mass of the sun. A debris disk has been detected in this system.

The presence of a moderately close companion could disrupt the orbit of a hypothetical planet in HD 10307's habitable zone. However, the uncertainty of the orbital parameters makes it equally uncertain exactly where stable orbits would be in this system.

== METI message to HD 10307 ==
There was a METI message sent to HD 10307. It was transmitted from Eurasia's largest radar, 70-meter Eupatoria Planetary Radar. The message was named Cosmic Call 2, it was sent on July 6, 2003, and it will arrive at HD 10307 in September 2044.

== See also ==
- Gliese 66
- Gliese 68
