= HD 84117 =

Star in the constellation Hydra

- Location of HD 84117 (circled in red)

Observation data Epoch J2000.0 Equinox J2000.0 (ICRS)
- Constellation: Hydra
- Right ascension: 09^{h} 42^{m} 14.4162^{s}
- Declination: −23° 54′ 56.042″
- Apparent magnitude (V): 4.918±0.046

Characteristics
- Evolutionary stage: Main sequence
- Spectral type: F8V
- U−B color index: 0.00
- B−V color index: +0.53
- R−I color index: +0.28

Astrometry
Radial velocity (R_{v})	34.70±0.13 km/s
Proper motion (μ)	RA: −399.497 mas/yr Dec.: +262.319 mas/yr
Parallax (π)	66.8827±0.1123 mas
Distance	48.77 ± 0.08 ly (14.95 ± 0.03 pc)
Absolute magnitude (M_{V})	4.05

Details
Mass	1.15±0.01 M_{☉}
Radius	1.302±0.003 R_{☉}
Luminosity	2.049+0.009 −0.008 L_{☉}
Habitable zone inner limit	1.03 AU
Habitable zone outer limit	2.41 AU
Surface gravity (log g)	4.46±0.03 cgs
Temperature	6,229±8 K
Metallicity [Fe/H]	−0.045±0.007 dex
Rotational velocity (v sin i)	7.0 km/s
Age	2.60+0.24 −0.19 Gyr

Other designations
- CD−23 8646, CPD−23 4656, GC 13394, GJ 364, HIP 47592, HR 3862, SAO 177866, PPM 256602, NLTT 22406, TYC 6602-2081-1

Database references
SIMBAD	data

HD 84117 is a star in the constellation of Hydra. It has an apparent visual magnitude of 4.92, hence can be seen from the naked eye in sufficiently dark skies, far from light pollution. Based on parallax measurements, it lies 48.77 light-years away. It is drifting away from the Solar System at a radial velocity of 34.7 km/s.

With a spectral class of F8V, this is a F star which is in the main sequence, fusing atoms of hydrogen into helium. Stellar evolution models suggest it is approaching the end of its main sequence lifetime. The star has about 1.15 times the Sun's mass and 1.30 times the Sun's radius. It radiates 2.05 times the Sun's luminosity from the photosphere at an effective temperature of 6,229 K. Its age is estimated at 2.6 billion years.

This star has a cold debris disk with a radius of 27.27 astronomical units. The temperature of the debris is estimated at 60 K (−213.2 °C), and the total mass of the disk is estimated at 1.2×10^{−5} Earth masses. Unlike other debris disk hosts, HD 84117 does not display an infrared excess. The disk contributes to less than 1.7%×10^{−4} of the system's luminosity.

HD 84117 presents a significant difference on proper motion measurements taken by the Hipparcos and Gaia spacecraft, suggesting it may be orbited by a giant planet.

== See also ==
- List of nearest F-type stars
