= Gliese 105 =

Triple star system in the constellation Cetus

- Location of Gliese 105 in the constellation Cetus

Observation data Epoch J2000 Equinox ICRS
- Constellation: Cetus
- Gliese 105 A
- Right ascension: 02^{h} 36^{m} 04.9013^{s}
- Declination: +06° 53′ 12.384″
- Apparent magnitude (V): 5.83
- Gliese 105 B
- Right ascension: 02^{h} 36^{m} 15.2669^{s}
- Declination: +06° 52′ 17.916″
- Apparent magnitude (V): 11.64 - 11.68
- Gliese 105 C
- Right ascension: 02^{h} 36^{m} 04.81^{s}
- Declination: +06° 53′ 15.0″
- Apparent magnitude (V): 16.77

Characteristics

Gliese 105 AC
- Spectral type: K3V + M7V
- U−B color index: +0.800
- B−V color index: +0.972

Gliese 105 B
- Spectral type: M3.5V
- U−B color index: +1.10
- B−V color index: +1.61
- Variable type: BY Dra

Astrometry

Gliese 105 A
Radial velocity (R_{v})	+25.21±0.14 km/s
Proper motion (μ)	RA: +1,778.585 mas/yr Dec.: +1,477.306 mas/yr
Parallax (π)	138.3400±0.3177 mas
Distance	23.58 ± 0.05 ly (7.23 ± 0.02 pc)
Absolute magnitude (M_{V})	6.50

Gliese 105 B
Radial velocity (R_{v})	+26.10±0.28 km/s
Proper motion (μ)	RA: +1,801.671 mas/yr Dec.: +1,450.487 mas/yr
Parallax (π)	138.4371±0.0420 mas
Distance	23.560 ± 0.007 ly (7.223 ± 0.002 pc)

Orbit
Primary	A
Secondary	C
Period (P)	68.0+4.8 −4.2 yr
Semi-major axis (a)	16.06+0.81 −0.72 au
Eccentricity (e)	0.617±0.014
Inclination (i)	47.17+0.84 −0.80°
Longitude of the node (Ω)	126.7±0.3°
Periastron epoch (T)	2458221±4 JD
Argument of periastron (ω) (primary)	135.3±0.3°
Semi-amplitude (K_{1}) (primary)	706.1±1.0 km/s

Details

Gliese 105 A
Mass	0.80±0.04 M_{☉}
Radius	0.743±0.024 R_{☉}
Luminosity (bolometric)	0.26±0.02 L_{☉}
Surface gravity (log g)	4.40±0.07 cgs
Temperature	4798±42 K
Metallicity [Fe/H]	−0.090+0.072 −0.070 dex
Age	11.0+1.6 −2.4 Gyr

Gliese 105 C
Mass	0.0973+0.0037 −0.0036 M_{☉}
Radius	0.1329+0.0057 −0.0055 R_{☉}
Luminosity (bolometric)	0.000758±0.000033 L_{☉}
Surface gravity (log g)	5.245+0.043 −0.041 cgs
Temperature	2626±50 K
Metallicity [Fe/H]	0.006±0.068 dex
Age	11.0+1.6 −2.4 Gyr

Gliese 105 B
Mass	0.277±0.024 M_{☉}
Radius	0.289+0.012 −0.011 R_{☉}
Luminosity (bolometric)	0.00795±0.00023 L_{☉}
Surface gravity (log g)	4.957+0.036 −0.035 cgs
Temperature	3205±59 K
Metallicity [Fe/H]	−0.01+0.11 −0.10 dex
Age	11.0+1.6 −2.4 Gyr

Other designations
- 268 G. Cet, GJ 105, CCDM J02361+0653
- Gliese 105 AC: BD+06 398, FK5 1073, HD 16160, HIP 12114, HR 753, SAO 110636, G 73-70, G 76-11, LFT 217, LHS 15, LTT 10858
- Gliese 105 B: BX Cet, G 73-71, G 76-12, LFT 218, LHS 16, LTT 10859

Database references
SIMBAD	Gl 105
- Gl 105 A
- Gl 105 B
- Gl 105 C

Gliese 105 (also known as 268 G. Ceti) is a triple star system in the constellation of Cetus. It is located relatively near the Sun at a distance of 23.6 light years (7.2 parsecs). Despite this, even the brightest component is barely visible with the unaided eye (see Bortle scale). No planets have yet been detected around any of the stars in this system.

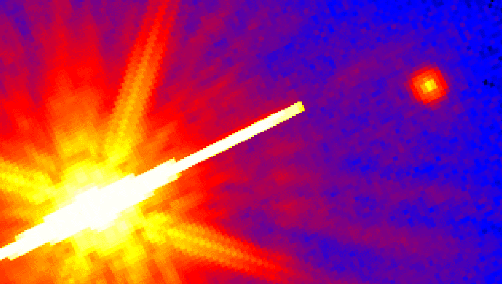
Gliese 105 A (left) and C (right).

All three of the stars are less massive than the Sun. The brightest component is designated HD 16160, and is known as Gliese 105 A. It is a K-type main-sequence star, about 70% the mass of the Sun. This star is unusual because its eruptions appear to not conform to the Waldmeier effect—i.e., the strongest eruptions of HD 16160 are not the ones characterized by the fast eruption onset.

A nearby star has a similar proper motion to Gliese 105 A, so it is assumed to be physically associated with the primary, and is known as Gliese 105 B. The two are visually separated by 165″, which corresponds to 1,200 astronomical units (au) given parallax. In 1994, Edward W. Weis announced that component B is a variable star. In 1997 it was given its variable star designation, BX Ceti. It is a BY Draconis variable star whose brightness varies between 11.64 and 11.68 magnitudes.

A third companion, known as Gliese 105 C, lies much closer to A, currently at a distance of approximately 24 au. The pair A-C have an estimated orbital period of about 70 years. While detected directly, Gliese 105 C has also been observed to perturb Gliese 105 A from its usual position; from that, its orbit is estimated to have a high eccentricity of around 0.64 and a semimajor axis of 17 au. Gliese 105 C is an extremely faint red dwarf. It is roughly 8 to 9 percent the mass of the Sun, and it is about 20,000 times fainter than its parent star in visible light—at a distance of 1 au (the distance from the Earth to the Sun) it would only be four times brighter than the full moon.

== See also ==
- List of nearest K-type stars
