= HD 20794 d =

Exoplanet orbiting 82 G. Eridani

Discovery
- Discovered by: N. Nari et al.
- Discovery date: August 22, 2023 (as a candidate); October 15, 2024 (confirmation announced)
- Detection method: Doppler spectroscopy (radial velocity method)

Designations
- Alternative names: HD 20794 f

Orbital characteristics
- Periastron: 0.75+0.15 −0.13 AU
- Apoastron: 1.96+0.13 −0.16 AU
- Semi-major axis: 1.3541±0.0068 AU
- Eccentricity: 0.45+0.11 −0.10
- Orbital period (sidereal): 647.6+2.5 −2.7 days (1.77 years)
- Angular distance: 124–322 mas across orbit
- Star: 82 G. Eridani (HD 20794)

Physical characteristics
- Mean radius: ~1.7 R_{🜨} (rocky composition); ~2.1 R_{🜨} (volatile composition)
- Mass: ≥5.82±0.57 M_{🜨}

HD 20794 d (82 G. Eridani d) is an exoplanet, possibly rocky, orbiting the solar-type star 82 G. Eridani. It is at least five times more massive than Earth and has an orbit partially within the habitable zone of its host star. Depending on its physical characteristics, which are poorly known, it could harbour life.

This planet is notable for its short distance from Earth, 19.7 ly (6.0 pc), which makes it one of the nearest exoplanets. It was discovered using doppler spectroscopy, after observations of periodic radial velocity variations of its host star. It had been suspected to exist since 2023, and was confirmed in 2024.

== Naming ==
The planets of 82 G. Eridani (HD 20794) are named with lowercase letters in order of discovery, following the exoplanet naming convention. However, designations are inconsistent across sources due to a complex history of detections.

HD 20794 d originally referred to a different planet with a 90-day period, referred to by newer sources as planet "c" since the original planet "c" is no longer believed to exist. However, the NASA Exoplanet Archive continues to refer to the 90-day planet as "d", using the letter "f" for the 650-day planet described here. (Planet "e" is a candidate from 2017 that has not been supported by subsequent studies.)

== Characteristics ==
HD 20794 d's existence was inferred solely on Doppler spectroscopy. A limitation of this method is that only a lower bound value in the mass can be obtained, assuming the orbital inclination relative to Earth is a right angle. Based on current data, 82 G. Eridani d's mass is at least six Earth masses; this value could be significantly higher if the planet is being viewed in an inclined orbit. This mass suggests the planet is likely a super-Earth, but does not rule out the possibility that it is a mini-Neptune, with no solid surface and a thick hydrogen/helium atmosphere, inhospitable to life. The true radius of the planet remains unknown, but estimates suggest if it is terrestrial it could be 1.7 R_{🜨} or so, and if it has a composition rich in volatiles it could be larger than 2.1 R_{🜨}.

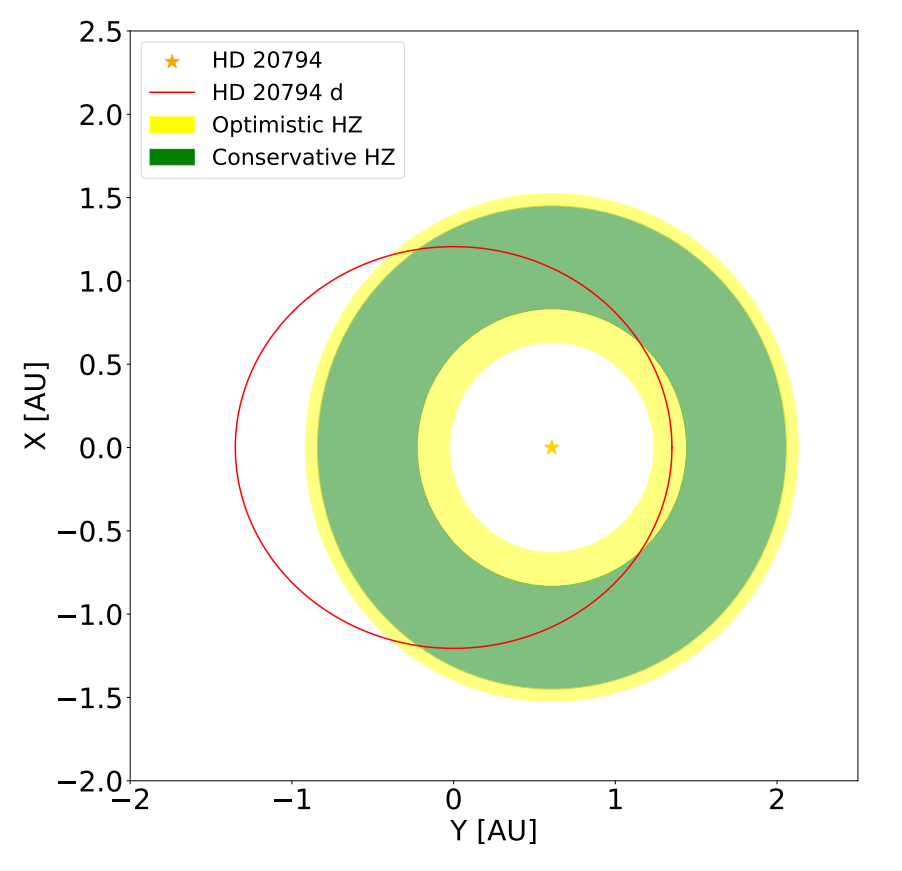
HD 20794 d just past the conservative habitable zone at periastron and considerably beyond the habitable zone at apoastron

HD 20794 d takes 650 days (1.8 years) to complete an orbit around its sun. It is located at an average orbital distance of 1.35 AU (202×10^{6} km), which would make it within the habitable zone (HZ), a region where water can exist in a liquid state. However, due to its eccentric orbit, the distance varies from 0.8 to 2.0 AU. At its longest separation from its star, the apoastron, it orbits beyond the habitable zone, and the irradiaton received decreases by a factor of 7 compared to periastron. About 59% of its orbit is spent in the optimistic habitable zone, 34% is spent in the conservative HZ, and 41% outside the HZ. It is believed that water on the surface would freeze when the planet is in the outer part of its highly elliptical orbit, beyond the habitable zone, due to the low temperature.

== Discovery and observations ==
The planet was first spotted in a radial velocity survey in 2023 by M. Cretignier and three other authors. The team observed five nearby Sun-like stars: Tau Ceti, HD 192310, 61 Virginis, HD 109200 and 82 G. Eridani. In 82 G. Eridani, they confirmed two planets with orbital periods of 18 and 89 days, which were already known to exist since 2011, and detected a periodic signal of 650 days, which could be the orbital period of another planet, in a more distant and eccentric orbit. The findings were published in August 2023, in the journal Astronomy and Astrophysics and the preprint repository arXiv. At that time 82 G. Erdani d was not confirmed.

The planet was confirmed in a follow-up study by N. Nari et al., which was published on October 15, 2024, about a year after the initial detection, also in the journal Astronomy and Astrophysics. The 650-day periodic signal was found to be the orbital period of planet d, and the same planets confirmed by Cretignier et al. were also detected. The confirmation was done by the doppler spectroscopy method, joining two-decade radial velocity observations from the HARPS and ESPRESSO spectrographs. The YARARA pipeline was then used to improve the quality of the HARPS observations.

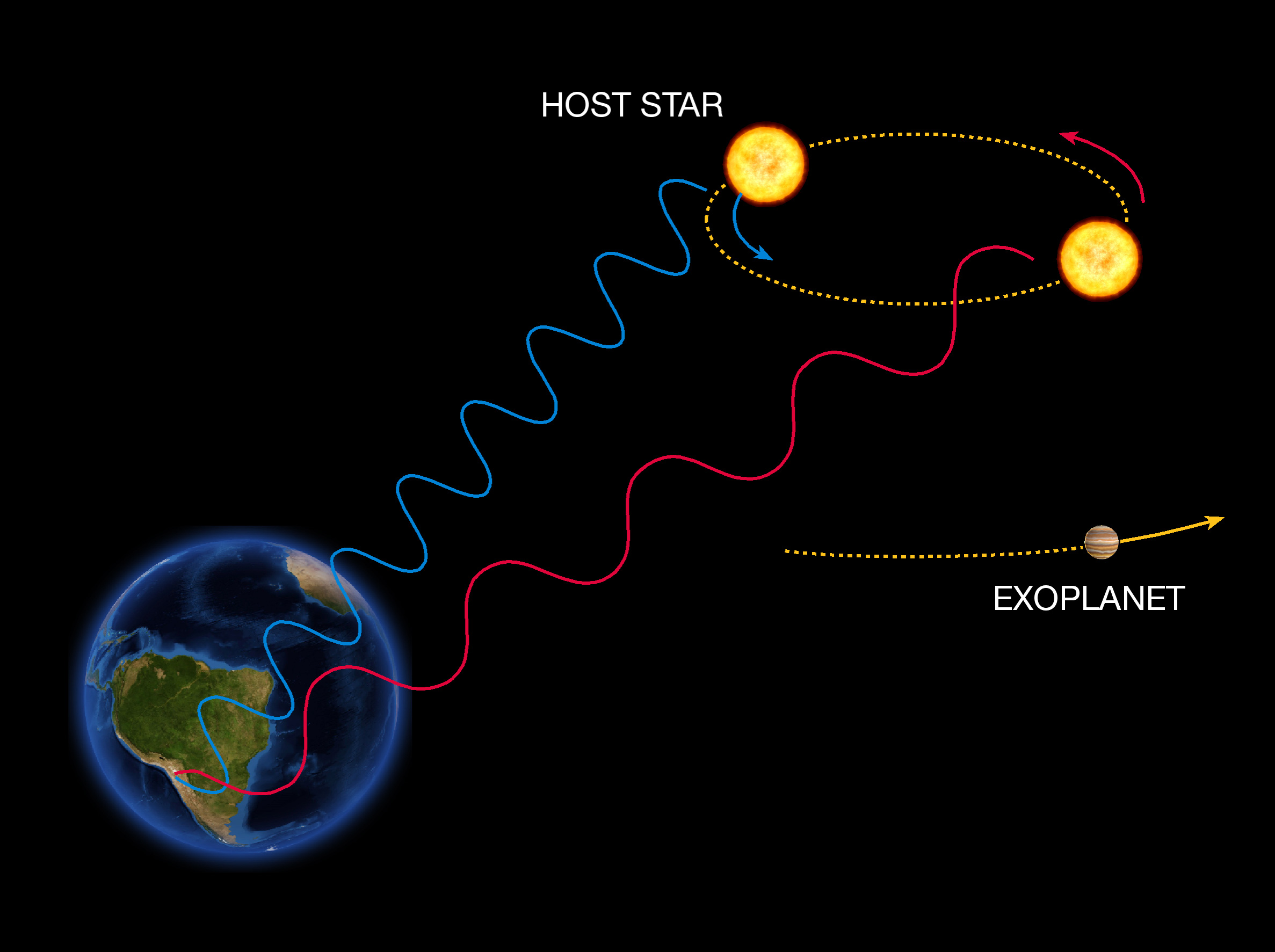
How the radial velocity method works

Doppler spectroscopy, also known as the radial velocity method, consists on observing small variations in the spectrum of a star, which are radial velocity variations and happen because the planet is able to gravitationally pull its host star, making its motion in Earth's direction vary slightly. The spectral lines of the host star are observed to become redder (redshift) in half of the planet's orbit, when the host star is being pulled against Earth, and later to become bluer (blueshift) in the other half, when the host star is being pulled towards Earth. 82 G. Eridani d pulls its host star at a speed of 60 centimeters per second.

== Host star ==
82 G. Eridani, also known as HD 20794 and e Eridani, is a nearby star visible to the unaided eye, as a faint point of light of apparent magnitude 4.25, in the constellation Eridanus. Its distance, inferred from its parallax shift, is 19.70±0.01 light-years, making it therefore one of the nearest stars.

The star has a spectral type of G8V, which is similar to the Sun's spectral type of G2V. The luminosity class "V" classifies 82 G. Eridani as a main sequence star fusing atoms of hydrogen into helium at its core. It is smaller and fainter than the Sun, with about 80% of the Sun's mass and 92% of the Sun's radius. It irradiates 60% of the solar luminosity from its photosphere at an effective temperature of 5,470 K (5,200 °C), giving it a yellow-white hue typical of late G-type stars.

It is a high-velocity star—it is moving quickly compared to the average—and hence is a member of Population II, generally older stars whose motions take them well outside the plane of the Milky Way. Like many other Population II stars, 82 G. Eridani is somewhat deficient in metals (elements heavier than hydrogen and helium), though much less deficient than many, and is older than the Sun. The abundance of iron relative to hydrogen is 40% that of the Sun. (Note: The abundance is estimated by taking [Fe/H] to the power of ten: 10^{[Fe/H]} = 10^{−0.42} = 0.38) Its age is estimated at 5.76±0.66 billion years (the Sun is 4.6 billion years old) based on its chromospheric activity indicator, but another estimate based on evolutionary tracks suggests a much higher value of 14+5
−6 billion years, overlapping with the current age of the universe (13.8 billion years).

In addition to planet d, 82 G. Eridani also hosts two other planets in closer orbits: HD 20794 b, which is a likely super-Earth with an orbital period of 18 days and a minimum mass of 2.15±0.17 M_{🜨}, and HD 20794 c, also likely a super-Earth, with an orbital period of 89 days and a minimum mass of 2.98±0.29 M_{🜨}. All of them were discovered by Doppler spectroscopy, with planets b and c being discovered in 2011 by F. Pepe et al.

== See also ==
- Kepler-452b
- Kepler-442b
- Kepler-62f
- Keid
- Ran
