= Xi Boötis =

Star in the constellation Boötes

- Location of ξ Boötis (circled)

Observation data Epoch J2000 Equinox ICRS
- Constellation: Boötes
- Right ascension: 14^{h} 51^{m} 23.37993^{s}
- Declination: +19° 06′ 01.6994″
- Apparent magnitude (V): 4.675 + 6.816

Characteristics
- Spectral type: G8 Ve + K4 Ve
- B−V color index: 0.725/1.165
- Variable type: BY Dra

Astrometry

ξ Boo A
Radial velocity (R_{v})	+1.59±0.12 km/s
Proper motion (μ)	RA: 127.468 mas/yr Dec.: −40.569 mas/yr
Parallax (π)	148.0695±0.1317 mas
Distance	22.03 ± 0.02 ly (6.754 ± 0.006 pc)
Absolute magnitude (M_{V})	5.54±0.007

ξ Boo B
Radial velocity (R_{v})	+2.31±0.13 km/s
Proper motion (μ)	RA: 133.376 mas/yr Dec.: −182.059 mas/yr
Parallax (π)	148.1793±0.0546 mas
Distance	22.011 ± 0.008 ly (6.749 ± 0.002 pc)

Orbit
Period (P)	152.46±0.07 years
Semi-major axis (a)	4.91985±0.00266" (33.23 AU (Note: Semi-major axis in AU = (semimajor axis in seconds)/ parallax = 4.91985″/0.1480695 = 33.23 AU; as the eccentricity is 0.5141, the distance fluctuates between 49% and 151% of the semi-major axis, roughly from 16 AU to 50 AU.))
Eccentricity (e)	0.5141±0.0005
Inclination (i)	140.538±0.065°
Longitude of the node (Ω)	167.938±0.162°
Periastron epoch (T)	2061.90±0.09
Argument of periastron (ω) (secondary)	24.015±0.258°

Details

ξ Boo A
Mass	0.88±0.03 M_{☉}
Radius	0.817±0.007 R_{☉}
Luminosity	0.562±0.036 L_{☉}
Surface gravity (log g)	4.561±0.017 cgs
Temperature	5,545±92 K
Metallicity [Fe/H]	−0.10±0.04 dex
Rotation	6.2 d
Age	200 Myr

ξ Boo B
Mass	0.66±0.07 M_{☉}
Radius	0.61 R_{☉}
Luminosity (visual, L_{V})	0.061 L_{☉}
Temperature	4,350±150 K
Rotation	11.5 days

Other designations
- ξ Boo, 37 Boötis, BD+19°2870, GC 19991, GJ 566, HD 131156, HIP 72659, HR 5544, SAO 101250, WDS J14514+1906

Database references
SIMBAD	The system
- A
- B
ARICNS	data

Xi Boötis is a binary star system in the northern constellation of Boötes. Its name is a Bayer designation that is Latinised from ξ Boötis, and abbreviated Xi Boo or ξ Boo. This is the nearest visible star in the constellation Boötes. The brighter, primary component of the pair has a typical apparent visual magnitude of 4.70, making it visible to the naked eye. Based on parallax measurements, it is located at a distance of 22.0 light-years (6.7 parsecs) from Earth. The pair are drifting further from the Sun with a radial velocity of +2 km/s.

== Properties ==
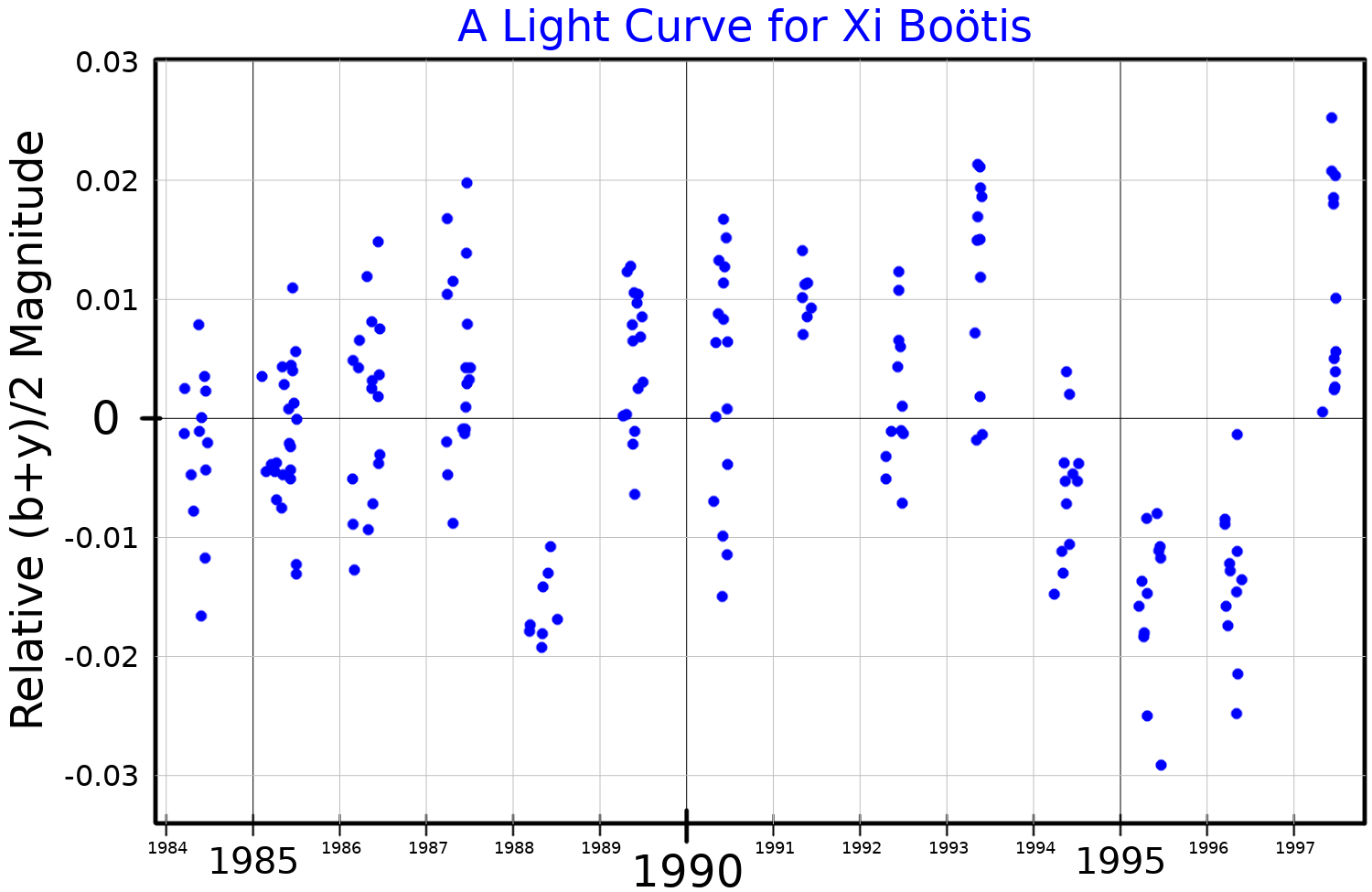
A light curve for Xi Bootis, showing the average of the b and y magnitudes as a function of time. Adapted from Lockwood et al. (2007)

The primary star in this system is a G-type main-sequence star with a stellar classification of G8 Ve, where the 'e' notation indicates emission lines in the spectrum. It is a BY Draconis variable with an apparent magnitude that varies from +4.52 to +4.67 with a period just over 10 days long. The magnetic activity in the star's chromosphere varies with time, but no activity cycle has been found (as of 2019). It has 88% of the mass and 82% of the radius of the Sun, but shines with just 56% the Sun's luminosity.

The secondary component is a smaller K-type main-sequence star with a class of K4 Ve. It has 66% of the Sun's mass and 61% of the Sun's radius. The star is radiating just 6.1% of the luminosity of the Sun from its photosphere at an effective temperature of 4,350 K. This gives it an apparent visual magnitude of 6.8, which by itself would be a challenge to view with the naked eye. As of 2019, it is located at an angular separation of 5.20″ from the primary, along a position angle of 298°.

The pair follow a wide, highly elliptical orbit around their common barycenter, completing an orbit every 152.5 years. Radial velocity measurements taken of the primary as part of an extrasolar planet search show a linear trend in the velocities that is likely due to the secondary star. The pair can be resolved using a small telescope. The binary system contains two of the closest young solar-type stars to the Sun, with a system age of about 200 million years old.

The primary star, component A, has been identified as a candidate for possessing a Kuiper-like belt, based on infrared observations. The estimated minimum mass of this dust disk is 2.4 times the mass of the Earth's Moon. (Compare to the value of 8.2 lunar masses for the Kuiper belt.)

A necessary condition for the existence of a planet in this system are stable zones where the object can remain in orbit for long intervals. For hypothetical planets in a circular orbit around the individual members of this star system, this maximum orbital radius is computed to be 3.8 AU for the primary and 3.5 AU for the secondary. A planet orbiting outside of both stars would need to be at least 108 AU distant.

== See also ==
- List of nearest K-type stars
