= Chi Draconis =

Star in the constellation of Draco

χ Draconis
- Location of χ Draconis (circled)

Observation data Epoch J2000 Equinox ICRS
- Constellation: Draco
- Right ascension: 18^{h} 21^{m} 03.38255^{s}
- Declination: +72° 43′ 58.2518″
- Apparent magnitude (V): 3.570 + 5.70

Characteristics
- Spectral type: F7V + K1V
- U−B color index: −0.06
- B−V color index: +0.49
- Variable type: Suspected

Astrometry
Radial velocity (R_{v})	+32.4 km/s
Proper motion (μ)	RA: +531.21 mas/yr Dec.: −349.71 mas/yr
Parallax (π)	121.80±0.54 mas
Distance	26.8 ± 0.1 ly (8.21 ± 0.04 pc)
Absolute magnitude (M_{V})	4.04

Orbit
Primary	χ Dra A
Secondary	χ Dra B
Period (P)	280.551+0.005 −0.006 d
Semi-major axis (a)	0.1234±0.0005″
Eccentricity (e)	0.4244±0.0003
Inclination (i)	73.65+0.25 −0.23°
Longitude of the node (Ω)	230.4±0.3°
Periastron epoch (T)	2,457,226.13±0.03
Argument of periastron (ω) (secondary)	117.77±0.06°

Details

χ Dra A
Mass	1.028±0.004 M_{☉}
Radius	1.159+0.029 −0.028 R_{☉}
Luminosity	1.88+0.14 −0.13 L_{☉}
Temperature	6,277±30 K
Metallicity [Fe/H]	−0.51±0.03 dex
Rotation	23.39±0.09 d
Rotational velocity (v sin i)	2.5 km/s
Age	5.3 Gyr

χ Dra B
Mass	0.735±0.003 M_{☉}
Radius	0.73±0.11 R_{☉}
Luminosity	0.29 L_{☉}
Temperature	4,940±200 K

Other designations
- χ Dra, 44 Dra, NSV 10749, BD+72°839, FK5 695, GJ 713, HD 170153, HIP 89937, HR 6927, SAO 9087, LHS 3379, LTT 15438

Database references
SIMBAD	data

Chi Draconis is a binary star system in the northern constellation Draco, consisting of a pair of sun-like stars which complete an orbit around each other in 281 days. The two stars' visual apparent magnitudes are 3.6 and 5.7, making the system visible to naked eye. Located at a distance of 26.78 light-years (8.210 parsecs) from the Sun, it is one of the 200 or so closest stars.

== Nomenclature ==
Chi Draconis (Latinized from χ Draconis, abbreviated χ Dra, Chi Dra) is the star system's Bayer designation. It also has the Flamsteed designation 44 Draconis. The two components are designated Aa and Ab in the Washington Double Star Catalog, but are often referred to as Chi Draconis A and Chi Draconis B in research papers.

In a 1971 NASA memorandum, this star system was listed with the name Alahakan. According to R. H. Allen's Star Names, Al ʽAuhaḳān, meaning "the two black bulls, or ravens", was an Arabic name for χ and ψ Draconis, among other stars in Draco.

In Chinese astronomy, this star is identified as Yùnǚsì (御女四), the fourth star of the asterism Yùnǚ (御女, Maids-in-waiting; also the name of 31 Leonis). Alternatively, it may be Zhùshǐ (柱史, Official of Royal Archives), usually identified as φ Draconis. R. H. Allen (using a now outdated romanization of Chinese) said it was Kwei She.

== Properties ==
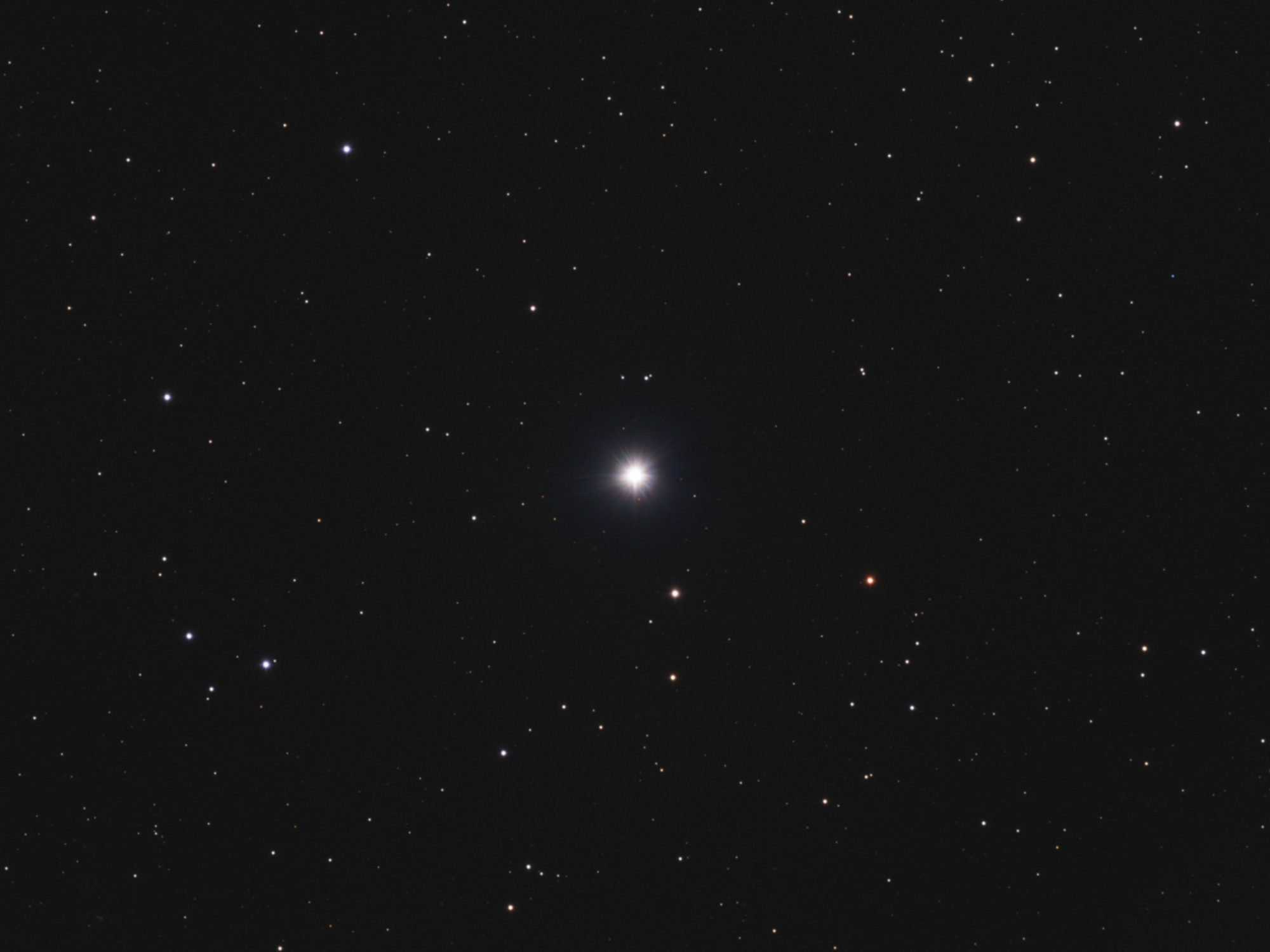
χ Draconis in optical light

χ Draconis is a double-lined spectroscopic binary system whose components have been resolved using speckle interferometry. Radial velocity and astrometric measurements reveal the two stars to complete an orbit in around 280 days, in a moderately eccentric orbit with semi-major axis of approximately 1 au. The distance between the two stars varies between about 0.58 au and 1.44 au along the orbit.

=== Chi Draconis A ===
Chi Draconis A, the more massive of the two stars, is an F7 main sequence star. It has a mass fractionally higher than the Sun's, and is slightly larger and hotter, resulting in it being 1.86 times as luminous as the Sun. The star appears to be relatively metal-poor, with about 30% as much iron as the Sun's, and its age is estimated to be about five billion years.

Chi Draconis A has a moderately low level of magnetic activity, with mean chromospheric activity S-index of around 0.177, compared to the Sun's 0.1621±0.0008. It appears to have a stable dipolar poloidal global magnetic field, with no evidence of polarity reversals over the 5-year observational baseline, although significant changes to the field and magnetic cycling over longer timescales remains possible. The modulation of this stable magnetic field enables the measurement of the star's rotation period. One work found the period to be 23.4 days, although a subsequent work was unable to determine the period. Additionally, it appears to rotate as a rigid body, with no evidence of differential rotation.

=== Chi Draconis B ===
Chi Draconis B is a K1 main sequence star. It has about three-quarters the mass of the Sun, and is both cooler and smaller. It is only about 0.29 times as luminous as the Sun. It is calculated to be 2.13 magnitudes fainter than the primary, so it would be of sixth magnitude if visible alone.

Circularly polarized light observations of the system failed to detect signatures of magnetic field for Chi Draconis B, indicating that its magnetic field at the time of observation is likely very weak or nonexistent.

== Visual companions ==
Multiple star catalogues list faint widely separated visible companion stars: a 12th-magnitude star and a 14th-magnitude star about 3′ (minutes) from χ Draconis, but only about 10″ (seconds) from each other. Both have much smaller parallaxes than χ Draconis and are unrelated background objects.

== See also ==
- List of star systems within 25–30 light-years
- List of nearest K-type stars
