= Rho1 Arae =

Star in the constellation Ara

ρ^{1} Arae
- Location of ρ^{1} Ara (circled)

Observation data Epoch J2000 Equinox ICRS
- Constellation: Ara
- Right ascension: 16^{h} 56^{m} 08.8420^{s}
- Declination: −50° 40′ 29.243″
- Apparent magnitude (V): 6.275

Characteristics
- Spectral type: B3 Vnpe
- U−B color index: −0.691
- B−V color index: +0.008
- Variable type: Be star

Astrometry
Radial velocity (R_{v})	+19.0±4.3 km/s
Proper motion (μ)	RA: −9.403 mas/yr Dec.: −9.592 mas/yr
Parallax (π)	3.3089±0.0441 mas
Distance	990 ± 10 ly (302 ± 4 pc)
Absolute magnitude (M_{V})	−0.16

Orbit
Period (P)	236.50±0.18 d
Inclination (i)	60±7°
Periastron epoch (T)	2458672.10±0.72 HJD
Semi-amplitude (K_{1}) (primary)	4.33±0.05 km/s
Semi-amplitude (K_{2}) (secondary)	52.83±1.49 km/s

Details

ρ^{1} Ara A
Mass	6.5±1.3 M_{☉}
Radius	4.21±0.20 R_{☉}
Luminosity	1,418 L_{☉}
Surface gravity (log g)	3.75 cgs
Temperature	19,800 K
Rotational velocity (v sin i)	370±10 km/s
Age	18.4±1.5 Myr

ρ^{1} Ara B
Mass	0.53±0.11 M_{☉}
Radius	0.27±0.04 R_{☉}
Luminosity	204 L_{☉}
Temperature	42,000 K

Other designations
- ρ^{1} Ara, V846 Arae, NSV 8047, CD−50 10905, GC 22790, HD 152478, HIP 82868, HR 6274, SAO 244280, PPM 345531

Database references
SIMBAD	data

Rho^{1} Arae is a star in the southern constellation of Ara. Its name is a Bayer designation that is Latinized from ρ^{1} Arae, and abbreviated Rho^{1} Ara or ρ^{1} Ara. Unusually for a star with a Bayer designation, it was not catalogued by Bayer in his Uranometria. It was instead first catalogued by Nicolas Lacaille, in his Coelum Australe Stelliferum published in 1763. This star gained the designation of Rho^{1} Arae in Bode's Uranographia, published in 1801. Rho^{1} Arae is one of the dimmest stars with a Bayer designation, having an apparent visual magnitude of just +6.275. According to the Bortle Dark-Sky Scale, this means the star is just barely visible to the naked eye in dark rural skies. Based upon parallax measurements, it is about 990 light-years (302 parsecs) distant from the Sun. It is receding from the Sun with a radial velocity of +19 km/s.

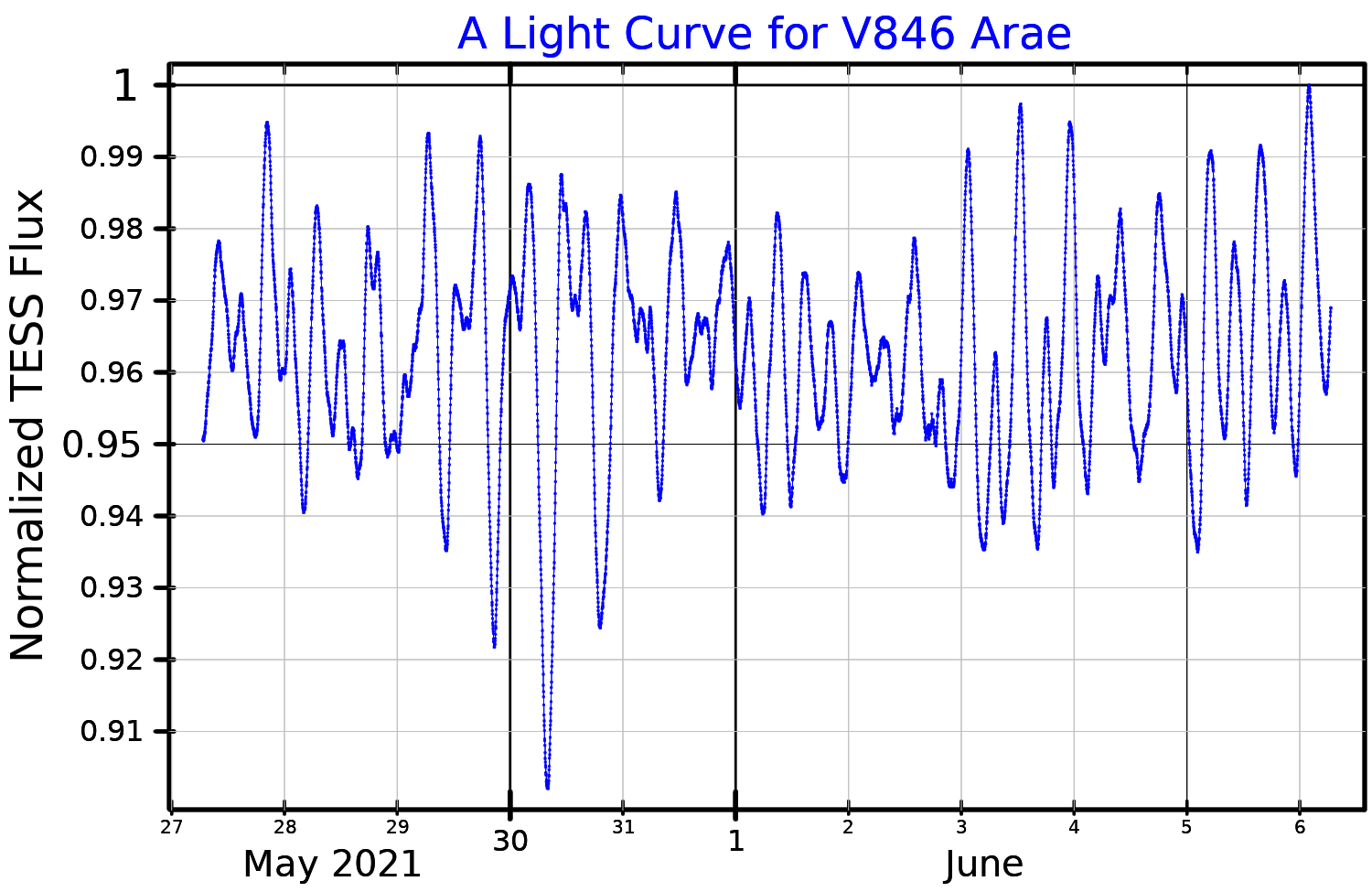
A light curve for V846 Arae, plotted from TESS data

Hipparcos data revealed that Rho^{1} Arae is a variable star. It was given its variable star designation, V846 Arae, in 1999. This is a spectroscopic binary system, which means that the presence of an orbiting companion is indicated by shifts in the spectrum. The primary star is a Be star, while the secondary star is a subdwarf O star; they orbit each other with a period of about 236.50 days.

The combined spectrum of this system matches a stellar classification of B3 Vnpe, which may indicate the primary is a B-type main-sequence star. The 'e' suffix indicates the presence of emission lines from the primary Be star. The primary star is spinning rapidly with a projected rotational velocity of 370±10 km/s, which makes it difficult to obtain reliable orbital elements. For Rho^{1} Arae, the emission lines are prominent and variable. The observed variability may be the result of a magnetized stellar wind that is flowing close to the circumstellar disk.

Rho^{1} Arae has a peculiar velocity of 27.4±4.9 km/s relative to its neighbors, making it a runaway star system. A scenario that it was ejected from the Scorpius–Centaurus OB association as a result of a past supernova explosion seems unlikely because of its binarity.
