= P Eridani =

Binary star system in the constellation Eridanus

p Eridani
- Location of p Eridani (circled in red)

Observation data Epoch J2000.0 Equinox ICRS
- Constellation: Eridanus
- A
- Right ascension: 01^{h} 39^{m} 47.813^{s}
- Declination: −56° 11′ 35.94″
- Apparent magnitude (V): 5.76
- B
- Right ascension: 01^{h} 39^{m} 47.565^{s}
- Declination: −56° 11′ 47.21″
- Apparent magnitude (V): 5.87

Characteristics
- Spectral type: K2V + K2V
- U−B color index: +0.59 / +0.53
- B−V color index: +0.90 / +0.87

Astrometry

A
Radial velocity (R_{v})	+21.74±0.12 km/s
Proper motion (μ)	RA: +262.615 mas/yr Dec.: +14.961 mas/yr
Parallax (π)	122.1088±0.0365 mas
Distance	26.710 ± 0.008 ly (8.189 ± 0.002 pc)
Absolute magnitude (M_{V})	6.25

B
Radial velocity (R_{v})	+20.15±0.12 km/s
Proper motion (μ)	RA: +309.230 mas/yr Dec.: +10.815 mas/yr
Parallax (π)	122.0035±0.0319 mas
Distance	26.733 ± 0.007 ly (8.196 ± 0.002 pc)
Absolute magnitude (M_{V})	6.27

Orbit
Period (P)	394±23 yr
Semi-major axis (a)	7.24±0.26" (59.3 AU (Note: Semi-major axis in AU = $\frac{semimajor\ axis\ in\ seconds}{parallax\ in\ seconds}\ {{=}}\ \frac{7.24}{.1221088}$ = 59.3 AU; as the eccentricity is 0.576, the distance fluctuates between 42.4% and 157.6% of that, roughly from 25.1 AU to 93.4 AU.))
Eccentricity (e)	0.576±0.063
Inclination (i)	141±4°
Longitude of the node (Ω)	6.8±7.9°
Periastron epoch (T)	1817±6
Argument of periastron (ω) (secondary)	360±10°

Details

p Eri A
Mass	0.77+0.04 −0.03 M_{☉}
Radius	0.76±0.02 R_{☉}
Luminosity	0.34±0.02 L_{☉}
Surface gravity (log g)	4.60±0.05 cgs
Temperature	5,046+43 −40 K
Metallicity [Fe/H]	–0.24 dex
Rotation	30 days
Age	4.94 Gyr

p Eri B
Mass	0.76+0.04 −0.02 M_{☉}
Radius	0.72+0.01 −0.02 R_{☉}
Luminosity	0.31±0.02 L_{☉}
Surface gravity (log g)	4.630±0.060 cgs
Temperature	5,076±43 K
Metallicity [Fe/H]	–0.19 dex
Rotation	39 days
Age	1.96 Gyr

Other designations
- DUN 5, p Eri, CD−56°328, GJ 66, HIP 7751, SAO 232490, WDS 01398-5612
- p Eri A: HD 10360, HR 486, LTT 903
- p Eri B: HD 10361, HR 487, LTT 902

Database references
SIMBAD	data
- p Eri A
- p Eri B

p Eridani is a binary star system in the constellation of Eridanus (the River) whose distance from the Sun is 26.7 light-years based upon parallax. It is visible to the naked eye as a dim, orange-hued star, about 1° 5′ from the bright star Achernar. The system is moving further from the Earth with a heliocentric radial velocity of about +20 km/s.

This system was found to be a double star in December 1825 by James Dunlop in Australia at his home at Paramatta, now spelt Parramatta. It consists of a pair of near identical K-type main-sequence stars with stellar classifications of K2V. Component A has visual magnitude 5.87, while component B is magnitude 5.76. They orbit each other with a period of 394 years, an eccentricity of 0.576, and a semimajor axis of 7.24″.

== Naming ==
The designation p Eridani was given to this star by Lacaille in his star catalogue Coelum Australe Stelliferum. Historically, it was sometimes also called 6 Eridani, which resembles a Flamsteed designation but actually comes from Bode. Bode numbers were commonly used in the early 19th century, but this antiquated system has now fallen into disuse for more than a century. The Flamsteed designation 6 Eridani refers to a different star.

== See also ==
- List of star systems within 25–30 light-years
- List of nearest K-type stars
- Gliese 65
- Gliese 67
