= Iota Arae =

Star in the constellation Ara

ι Arae
- Location of ι Arae (circled)

Observation data Epoch J2000 Equinox J2000
- Constellation: Ara
- Right ascension: 17^{h} 23^{m} 16.07624^{s}
- Declination: −47° 28′ 05.5057″
- Apparent magnitude (V): 5.18–5.26

Characteristics
- Spectral type: B2 IVe + sdO
- U−B color index: −0.82
- B−V color index: −0.11
- R−I color index: −0.08
- Variable type: BE

Astrometry
Radial velocity (R_{v})	−19.0±7.4 km/s
Proper motion (μ)	RA: −6.209 mas/yr Dec.: −17.699 mas/yr
Parallax (π)	3.5613±0.0904 mas
Distance	920 ± 20 ly (281 ± 7 pc)
Absolute magnitude (M_{V})	−2.06

Orbit
Period (P)	176.17±0.04
Inclination (i)	46±6°
Periastron epoch (T)	2458654.2±0.5 HJD
Semi-amplitude (K_{1}) (primary)	5.80±0.06 km/s
Semi-amplitude (K_{2}) (secondary)	57.6±0.6 km/s

Details

ι Ara A
Mass	8.3±0.4 M_{☉}
Radius	6.3 R_{☉}
Luminosity	10,864 L_{☉}
Surface gravity (log g)	4.18 cgs
Temperature	20,172 K
Rotational velocity (v sin i)	340 km/s
Age	30.0±7.4 Myr

ι Ara B
Mass	1.06±0.29 M_{☉}
Radius	0.61±0.09 R_{☉}
Luminosity	437 L_{☉}
Temperature	33,800 K

Other designations
- ι Ara, NSV 8566, CD−47°11484, FK5 3379, GC 23470, HD 157042, HIP 85079, HR 6451, SAO 227886, PPM 322888

Database references
SIMBAD	data

Iota Arae is a binary star system in the southern constellation of Ara. Its name is a Bayer designation that is Latinized from ι Arae, and abbreviated Iota Ara or ι Ara. The system has a combined apparent visual magnitude of 5.2. Based upon the Bortle Dark-Sky Scale, this means it is visible to the naked eye from suburban skies. Parallax measurements yield a distance estimate of 920 light-years (281 parsecs), give or take a 20 light-year margin of error. It is drifting closer to the Sun with a radial velocity of around −19 km/s.

The primary component is an evolved subgiant star with a stellar classification of B2 IVe. The 'e' notation indicates the spectrum displays emission lines, which means this is a Be star that is surrounded by hot, circumstellar gas. It is spinning rapidly with a projected rotational velocity of 340 km/s. The Doppler effect from this rotation is causing the absorption lines to widen and become nebulous.

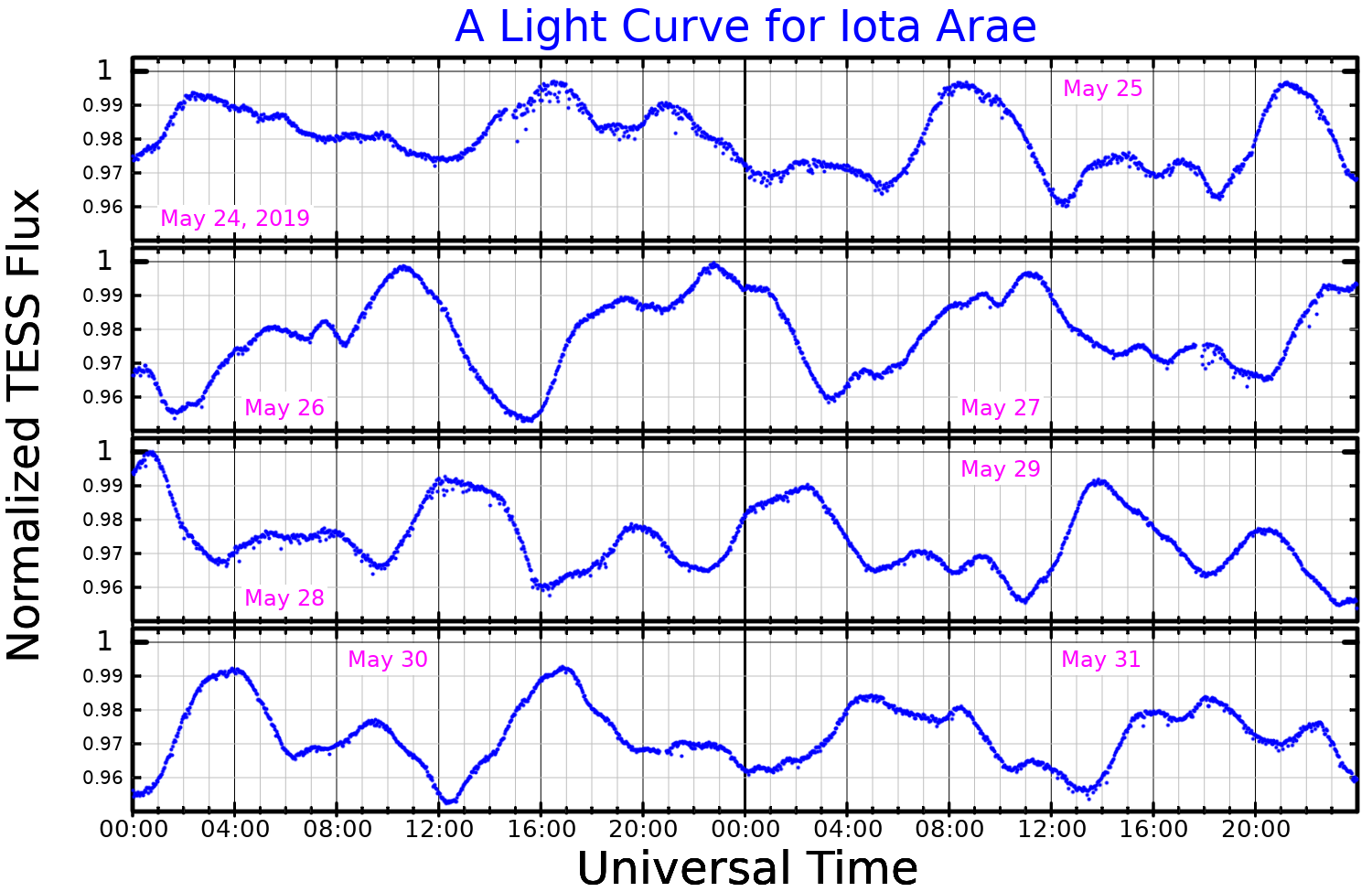
A light curve for Iota Arae, plotted from TESS data

Iota Arae has around 8.3 times the mass of the Sun and is shining brightly with 10,864 times the Sun's luminosity. This energy is being radiated into space from the outer atmosphere at an effective temperature of 20,172 K, giving it the characteristic blue-white hue of a B-type star. The General Catalog of Variable Stars classifies it as a BE variable star, ranging from visual magnitude 5.18 to 5.26 with a period of 13.36 hours. In a study of the Hipparcos data, it was found to vary in brightness by 0.054 in magnitude with no clear period.

This is a spectroscopic binary system with an orbital period of 176 days. The companion is a subdwarf O star with a mass similar to the Sun but only 61% of the Sun's radius.
