= Eta Leporis =

Star in the constellation of Lepus

η Leporis
- Location of η Leporis (circled in red)

Observation data Epoch J2000.0 Equinox J2000.0 (ICRS)
- Constellation: Lepus
- Right ascension: 05^{h} 56^{m} 24.29300^{s}
- Declination: −14° 10′ 03.7189″
- Apparent magnitude (V): 3.72

Characteristics
- Spectral type: F2 V
- U−B color index: +0.01
- B−V color index: +0.33
- R−I color index: +0.16

Astrometry
Radial velocity (R_{v})	−1.6±0.2 km/s
Proper motion (μ)	RA: −42.06 mas/yr Dec.: +139.26 mas/yr
Parallax (π)	67.21±0.25 mas
Distance	48.5 ± 0.2 ly (14.88 ± 0.06 pc)
Absolute magnitude (M_{V})	+2.85

Details
Mass	1.42 M_{☉}
Radius	1.52 R_{☉}
Luminosity	6.03 L_{☉}
Surface gravity (log g)	4.13 cgs
Temperature	6,899±80 K
Metallicity [Fe/H]	−0.19 dex
Rotational velocity (v sin i)	26 km/s
Age	1.80 Gyr

Other designations
- η Lep, 16 Leporis, BD−14°1286, FK5 226, GC 7492, GJ 225, HD 40136, HIP 28103, HR 2085, SAO 150957, PPM 216474

Database references
SIMBAD	data

Eta Leporis, Latinised from η Leporis, is a single, yellow-white-hued star in the southern constellation of Lepus, the hare. It is visible to the naked eye with an apparent visual magnitude of approximately 3.72. The annual parallax shift of 67.21 mas yields a distance estimate of 49 light-years. It is moving closer to the Sun with a radial velocity of −1.6 km/s.

This is an ordinary F-type main-sequence star with a stellar classification of F2 V. It is about 1.8 billion years old and spinning with a projected rotational velocity of 26 km/s. The star has 1.4 times the mass of the Sun and 1.5 times the Sun's radius. It shines with six times the Sun's luminosity, which is being radiated from its photosphere at an effective temperature of around 6,899 K. Using the IRS instrument on the Spitzer Space Telescope, excess infrared emission has been observed from the star, which can be modeled by a dust disk extending from 1 to 16 astronomical units from Eta Leporis.
