= List of exoplanets detected by radial velocity =

The following is a list of 456 extrasolar planets that were only detected by radial velocity method –– 31 confirmed and 323 candidates, sorted by orbital periods. Since none of these planets are transiting or directly observed, they do not have measured radii and generally their masses are only minimum. The true masses can be determined when astrometry calculates the inclination of the orbit.

There are 160 members of the multi-planet systems –– 21 confirmed and 139 candidates.

== List of confirmed extrasolar planets ==
The most massive confirmed exoplanet is Iota Draconis b, which masses 9.40 M_{J} (i.e. 9.4 times the mass of Jupiter); the least massive confirmed planet is Gliese 581 e, which masses 0.007906 M_{J} or 2.51 M_{🜨}. The longest period of any confirmed exoplanet is 55 Cancri Ad, which takes 5169 days or 14.15 years to make one trip around the star; the shortest period is Gliese 876 d, which takes just 1.938 days or 46.5 hours to orbit the star.

Yellow rows denote the members of a multi-planet system

Planet	Mass (M_{J})	Period (days)	Semi-major axis (AU)	Eccentricity	Inclination (°)	Year
Gliese 876 d	0.021	1.938	0.021	0.2067	50.201	2005
Santamasa	1.500	2.138	0.035	0.0079		2006
GJ 3634 b	0.022	2.646	0.029	0.0801	58.683	2011
Gliese 581e	0.008	3.149	0.028	0.0261	50.537	2009
Tau Boötis b	8.389	3.312	0.048	0.0236	150.521	1996
COROT-7c	0.026	3.698	0.046	0.0018	78.206	2009
Dimidium	0.472	4.231	0.053	0.0132		1995
Saffar	1.266	4.617	0.059	0.0226	147.169	1996
Gliese 581b	0.059	5.369	0.041	0.0159	57.259	2005
Gliese 667 Cb	0.018	7.432	0.054	0.0468		2009
Gliese 581c	0.021	12.929	0.073	0.1674	53.550	2007
HD 38529 b	0.782	14.310	0.129	0.2477	123.331	2000
Galileo	1.030	14.651	0.118	0.0096	126.780	1996
Gliese 667 Cc	0.012	28.155	0.070	0.0127		2011
Gliese 876 c	0.714	30.088	0.131	0.2559	48.071	2001
Brahe	0.214	44.364	0.247	0.0048	53.241	2002
Gliese 876 b	2.276	61.117	0.211	0.0324	83.929	1998
Gliese 581d	0.026	66.800	0.218	0.3809	58.257	2007
HD 20794 d	0.015	90.309	0.388	0.0143		2011
Gliese 876 e	0.046	124.262	0.338	0.0546	120.548	2010
HD 60532 b	3.150	201.825	0.761	0.2776	162.580	2008
Samh	6.673	237.746	0.753	0.2396	16.746	1999
Harriot	0.190	259.805	0.804	0.2963	54.619	2005
Epsilon Reticuli b	4.500	415.241	1.156	0.0583	17.403	2000
Hypatia	9.395	511.098	1.272	0.7124	69.920	2002
HD 147513 b	1.268	540.361	1.265	0.2577	111.525	2002
Thestias	2.409	589.636	1.693	0.0204	90.684	2006
HD 60532 c	7.457	607.065	1.586	0.0383	162.060	2008
Quijote	1.709	643.252	1.495	0.1284	78.867	2000
HD 128311 c	3.215	918.751	1.720	0.1709	49.731	2005
q1 Eridani b	1.493	1040.389	2.055	0.1632	38.640	2003
Majriti	6.094	1302.605	2.527	0.3181	42.633	1999
HAT-P-17c	1.416	1797.885	2.748	0.0968	77.217	2010
Taphao Kaew	0.541	2391.005	3.532	0.0981		2001
Ægir	1.552	2502.236	3.383	0.7021	30.110	2000
Lipperhey	4.783	5169.447	5.901	0.0141	53.031	2002
47 Ursae Majoris d	1.624	14001.787	11.477	0.1604		2010

== List of extrasolar planet candidates ==
The most massive exoplanet candidate is HD 217786 b, which masses 12.98 M_{J}; the least massive confirmed planet is HD 10180 b, which masses 0.004 M_{J} or 3.1 M_{🜨}. The longest period of any confirmed exoplanet is 47 Ursae Majoris d, which takes 14002 days or 38.33 years to make one trip around the star; the shortest period is HD 156668 b, which takes just 1.26984 days or 31.162 hours to orbit the star.

Yellow rows denote the members of a multi-planet system

Planet	Minimum mass (M_{J})	Period (days)	Semi-major axis (AU)	Eccentricity	Year
HD 156668 b	0.010	1.270	0.022	0.0003	2010
HD 10180 b	0.004	1.778	0.022	0.0002	2010
HD 212301 b	0.396	2.457	0.036	0.0146	2005
HD 73256 b	1.875	2.549	0.039	0.0275	2003
HD 63454 b	0.380	2.818	0.036	2e−05	2005
HD 83443 b	0.398	2.986	0.038	0.0083	2000
HD 46375 b	0.226	3.024	0.047	0.0629	2000
HD 179949 b	0.916	3.093	0.045	0.0219	2000
HD 187123 b	0.532	3.097	0.042	0.0349	1998
HD 134060 b	0.035	3.270	0.046	0.3981	2011
HD 330075 b	0.624	3.369	0.043	0.0334	2004
HD 88133 b	0.299	3.408	0.047	0.1331	2004
HD 2638 b	0.478	3.444	0.044	0.0223	2005
BD-10°3166 b	0.458	3.488	0.045	0.0190	2000
HD 75289 b	0.467	3.509	0.046	0.0336	1999
HD 219828 b	0.062	3.834	0.051	0.0210	2007
HD 215497 b	0.020	3.934	0.046	0.1554	2009
HD 76700 b	0.233	3.971	0.049	0.0955	2002
HD 149143 b	1.331	4.072	0.053	0.0161	2005
HD 47186 b	0.072	4.084	0.050	0.0379	2008
HD 102195 b	0.488	4.115	0.049	0.0615	2006
HD 125612 c	0.058	4.155	0.052	0.2726	2009
61 Virginis b	0.016	4.215	0.050	0.1188	2009
HD 40307 b	0.013	4.312	0.047	0.0081	2008
Gliese 674 b	0.035	4.694	0.039	0.1995	2007
HD 49674 b	0.115	4.947	0.058	0.2900	2002
HD 109749 b	0.275	5.238	0.063	0.0132	2005
HD 7924 b	0.029	5.398	0.057	0.1700	2009
HIP 49067 b	0.045	5.602	0.056	0.1467	2009
HD 39194 b	0.012	5.636	0.059	0.2013	2011
HD 10180 c	0.041	5.760	0.064	0.0452	2010
HD 1461 b	0.021	5.773	0.065	0.1431	2009
HD 45184 b	0.040	5.887	0.062	0.3023	2011
HD 118203 b	2.145	6.134	0.070	0.3088	2005
HD 68988 b	1.851	6.276	0.070	0.1228	2001
HD 168746 b	0.247	6.403	0.066	0.1070	2000
HD 102956 b	0.965	6.495	0.081	0.0478	2010
HIP 14810 b	3.876	6.674	0.069	0.1427	2006
HD 185269 b	0.910	6.838	0.077	0.2814	2006
Gliese 433 b	0.019	6.889	0.056	0.0210	2009
HD 217107 b	1.411	7.127	0.073	0.1301	1998
HD 215152 b	0.009	7.283	0.077	0.3444	2011
HD 96700 b	0.028	8.126	0.081	0.0985	2011
Gliese 439 b	0.036	8.135	0.078	0.1875	2011
HD 69830 b	0.032	8.667	0.078	0.1027	2006
Gliese 176 b	0.076	8.784	0.066	0.2286	2007
HD 181433 b	0.024	9.374	0.080	0.3963	2008
HD 40307 c	0.022	9.618	0.080	0.0204	2008
Mu Arae c	0.033	9.639	0.091	0.1721	2004
HD 125595 b	0.045	9.670	0.081	0.1156	2009
HD 130322 b	1.089	10.724	0.088	0.0248	2000
HD 215152 c	0.010	10.866	0.100	0.3770	2011
HD 108147 b	0.264	10.901	0.104	0.5344	2000
HD 136352 b	0.017	11.577	0.093	0.1777	2011
HD 20003 b	0.038	11.849	0.107	0.4038	2011
HD 134606 b	0.029	12.083	0.088	0.1494	2011
HD 93385 b	0.026	13.186	0.143	0.1469	2011
HD 1461 c	0.019	13.505	0.078	0.0241	2011
HD 39194 c	0.019	14.025	0.108	0.1065	2011
Gliese 253 b	0.041	14.068	0.115	0.1547	2011
HD 13808 b	0.033	14.182	0.111	0.1666	2011
HD 189567 b	0.032	14.275	0.110	0.2333	2011
HD 179079 b	0.079	14.476	0.120	0.1145	2009
HD 4308 b	0.041	15.608	0.115	0.2653	2005
Gliese 86 b	3.912	15.766	0.114	0.0461	1998
HD 10180 d	0.037	16.358	0.128	0.0881	2010
HD 31527 b	0.036	16.546	0.110	0.1290	2011
83 Leonis Bb	0.109	17.043	0.122	0.2542	2005
Gliese 777 c	0.060	17.111	0.132	0.2369	2005
HD 16417 b	0.070	17.239	0.138	0.1974	2009
HD 27894 b	0.618	17.991	0.122	0.0491	2005
HD 33283 b	0.335	18.179	0.145	0.4822	2006
HD 195019 Ab	3.705	18.202	0.138	0.0136	1998
HD 20794 b	0.008	18.315	0.134	0.0214	2011
HD 154088 b	0.019	18.596	0.138	0.3774	2011
HD 40307 d	0.029	20.462	0.133	0.0397	2008
HD 102117 b	0.171	20.666	0.145	0.0912	2004
HD 6434 b	0.397	22.093	0.154	0.1799	2000
HD 21693 b	0.032	22.656	0.164	0.2627	2011
HD 192263 b	0.642	24.348	0.154	0.0552	1999
HD 224693 b	0.715	26.730	0.192	0.0501	2006
HD 136352 c	0.036	27.582	0.166	0.1576	2011
HD 20781 b	0.038	29.150	0.168	0.1117	2011
HD 9446 b	0.700	30.052	0.189	0.1975	2010
HD 69830 c	0.038	31.562	0.186	0.1347	2006
Gliese 439 c	0.409	32.033	0.195	0.0542	2011
HD 20003 c	0.042	33.823	0.215	0.1557	2011
HD 39194 d	0.016	33.941	0.194	0.1986	2011
HD 204313 c	0.054	34.873	0.213	0.1687	2011
HD 43691 b	2.495	36.956	0.242	0.1405	2007
HD 11964 c	0.111	37.822	0.229	0.0407	2005
61 Virginis c	0.057	38.021	0.218	0.1379	2009
HD 20794 c	0.008	40.114	0.226	0.0175	2011
HIP 57050 b	0.298	41.397	0.163	0.3137	2010
HD 45652 b	0.465	43.597	0.230	0.3782	2008
HD 147018 b	2.116	44.236	0.239	0.4686	2009
HD 93385 c	0.032	46.025	0.329	0.2359	2011
HD 103197 b	0.098	47.843	0.249	0.0058	2009
HD 107148 b	0.212	48.056	0.269	0.0421	2006
HD 10180 e	0.079	49.745	0.269	0.0261	2010
HD 90156 b	0.057	49.769	0.250	0.3064	2009
HD 31527 c	0.050	51.284	0.235	0.1102	2011
HD 74156 b	1.884	51.648	0.291	0.6368	2001
HD 117618 b	0.178	52.190	0.278	0.4168	2004
HD 13808 c	0.036	53.832	0.270	0.4339	2011
HD 21693 c	0.065	53.881	0.293	0.2422	2011
HD 37605 b	2.858	54.957	0.261	0.7374	2004
HD 104067 b	0.164	55.846	0.264	0.2498	2009
HIP 12961 b	0.470	57.010	0.249	0.3100	2009
HD 168443 b	8.016	58.113	0.299	0.5286	1998
Gliese 370 b	0.011	58.427	0.383	0.1082	2011
HD 134606 c	0.038	59.519	0.256	0.2923	2011
54 Piscium b	0.235	62.228	0.284	0.5891	2003
HD 121504 b	1.221	64.602	0.316	0.0328	2000
HD 109246 b	0.773	68.275	0.328	0.1186	2010
HD 101930 b	0.300	70.457	0.302	0.1126	2005
HD 178911 Bb	7.352	71.487	0.345	0.1391	2001
Gliese 785 b	0.068	74.389	0.318	0.2972	2010
HD 163607 b	0.771	75.229	0.336	0.7332	2011
79 Ceti b	0.260	75.593	0.350	0.2517	2000
HD 20781 c	0.050	85.131	0.343	0.2757	2011
Gliese 253 c	0.056	95.415	0.413	0.4132	2011
HD 96700 c	0.040	103.486	0.440	0.3734	2011
HD 145377 b	5.762	103.945	0.449	0.3067	2008
HD 157172 b	0.120	104.840	0.393	0.4551	2011
Gliese 667 Cd	0.022	106.433	0.423	0.6775	2012
HD 136352 d	0.030	106.722	0.408	0.4322	2011
HD 177830 c	0.149	110.889	0.514	0.3495	2010
HIP 79431 b	2.090	111.650	0.358	0.2938	2010
70 Virginis b	7.491	116.671	0.454	0.4322	1996
HD 216770 b	0.653	118.450	0.458	0.3682	2003
HD 52265 b	1.093	118.957	0.504	0.3250	2000
HD 102365 b	0.050	122.079	0.463	0.3401	2011
HD 208487 b	0.519	122.506	0.530	0.2408	2004
HD 10180 f	0.075	122.763	0.492	0.1355	2010
61 Virginis d	0.072	123.006	0.476	0.3453	2009
HD 102272 b	5.862	127.585	0.613	0.0512	2008
HD 156279 b	9.693	131.055	0.342	0.7076	2011
GJ 3021 b	3.366	133.712	0.493	0.5109	2000
Xi Aquilae b	2.775	136.755	0.679	0.0197	2008
HD 231701 b	1.784	141.604	0.556	0.1011	2007
HD 93083 b	0.371	143.578	0.482	0.1398	2005
HIP 14810 c	1.281	147.735	0.545	0.1637	2006
HD 37124 b	0.675	154.378	0.529	0.0536	1999
HD 32518 b	3.044	157.543	0.594	0.0137	2009
HD 100655 b	1.731	157.571	0.681	0.0847	2011
HD 154672 b	4.956	163.910	0.598	0.6087	2008
HD 11506 c	0.824	170.457	0.638	0.4189	2009
HD 145457 b	2.929	176.253	0.767	0.1119	2010
HD 5891 b	7.562	177.106	0.765	0.0663	2011
91 Aquarii b	2.942	181.692	0.856	0.0027	2003
Arkas	2.673	184.023	0.814	0.0061	2008
Spe	4.825	185.840	0.826	0.0094	2008
HD 73526 b	2.036	188.265	0.647	0.3871	2002
HD 215456 b	0.101	191.990	0.608	0.1485	2011
HD 9446 c	1.818	192.887	0.654	0.0571	2010
HD 155358 b	0.895	194.981	0.629	0.1117	2007
HD 69830 d	0.057	197.041	0.629	0.0689	2006
HD 104985 b	6.331	198.161	0.754	0.0311	2003
HD 75898 b	1.476	204.152	0.736	0.0979	2007
HD 82943 c	1.740	219.024	0.750	0.0242	2001
HD 169830 b	2.921	225.618	0.814	0.3092	2000
HD 218566 b	0.211	225.750	0.688	0.3203	2010
HD 45364 b	0.187	226.934	0.680	0.1684	2008
HD 8574 b	1.962	228.755	0.743	0.3676	2001
HIP 49067 c	0.329	237.555	0.680	0.1862	2009
HD 89744 b	8.580	255.864	0.883	0.7043	2000
HD 202206 c	2.397	255.866	0.821	0.2669	2004
23 Librae b	1.592	258.193	0.806	0.2331	1999
HD 40979 b	3.830	263.100	0.829	0.2477	2002
HD 113538 b	0.266	263.321	0.713	0.6122	2010
HD 12661 b	2.339	263.585	0.822	0.3608	2001
HIP 104780 b	1.468	268.937	0.776	0.2901	2009
4 Ursae Majoris b	7.131	269.275	0.875	0.4321	2007
HD 31527 d	0.052	274.488	0.718	0.3765	2011
HD 205739 b	1.366	279.796	0.894	0.2674	2008
HD 164509 b	0.478	282.431	0.849	0.2557	2011
SAO 38269 b	0.913	292.567	0.872	0.2178	2011
HD 175541 b	0.610	297.346	1.031	0.3303	2007
HD 59686 b	5.256	302.561	1.088	0.0153	2003
Rocinante	0.522	310.547	0.920	0.0666	2006
Iota Horologii b	2.078	320.068	0.947	0.1610	1998
HD 173416 b	2.716	323.586	1.158	0.2098	2009
HD 33142 b	1.333	326.565	1.103	0.1444	2011
HD 43197 b	0.603	327.838	0.917	0.8303	2009
HD 137388 b	0.223	329.837	1.017	0.3596	2011
HD 148427 b	0.957	331.475	1.060	0.1587	2009
HD 142 b	1.276	337.112	0.979	0.2327	2001
HD 210702 b	2.956	341.118	1.174	0.2725	2007
HD 45364 c	0.658	342.851	0.896	0.0973	2008
HD 122430 b	3.373	344.946	1.075	0.6794	2003
HIP 5158 b	1.422	345.725	0.887	0.5233	2009
HD 192699 b	2.333	351.470	1.159	0.1487	2007
HD 63765 b	0.687	355.901	0.936	0.4312	2009
HD 4313 b	1.408	355.968	1.177	0.0409	2010
HD 17092 b	4.601	359.851	1.311	0.1660	2007
HD 96063 b	0.895	361.078	1.120	0.2142	2011
HD 38283 b	0.341	363.199	1.022	0.4096	2011
HD 212771 b	1.857	373.290	1.064	0.1111	2010
HD 92788 b	3.681	377.680	1.044	0.3323	2000
HD 73526 c	2.259	377.755	1.029	0.3955	2006
Alpha Arietis b	1.819	380.786	1.196	0.2504	2011
HD 20868 b	1.988	380.848	0.945	0.7549	2008
HD 28185 b	5.722	383.014	1.030	0.0701	2001
HD 100777 b	1.172	383.662	1.045	0.3571	2007
HD 142415 b	1.692	386.292	1.068	0.5371	2003
HD 28678 b	1.676	387.065	0.991	0.1679	2011
HD 33564 b	9.132	388.009	1.122	0.3365	2005
HD 108874 b	1.345	394.484	1.048	0.1276	2002
HD 4203 b	2.073	400.943	1.086	0.5193	2001
HD 4208 b	0.804	400.944	1.038	0.0518	2001
HD 177830 b	1.490	406.571	1.223	0.0086	1999
HD 38858 b	0.096	407.146	0.861	0.2665	2011
HD 154857 b	1.845	408.759	1.135	0.5101	2004
HD 167042 b	1.642	416.064	1.287	0.0262	2007
Gamma^{1} Leonis b	8.782	428.492	1.190	0.1445	2009
HD 47536 b	5.202	429.102	1.092	0.2165	2002
Gliese 439 d	0.527	431.678	1.104	0.2676	2011
HD 1502 b	3.096	431.766	1.158	0.1007	2011
HD 98219 b	1.775	436.864	1.230	0.1355	2011
HD 99109 b	0.502	439.254	1.102	0.0899	2006
HD 82943 b	1.809	441.194	1.197	0.3912	2000
HD 210277 b	1.290	442.103	1.169	0.4756	1998
HD 108863 b	2.632	443.442	1.122	0.0885	2011
HD 128311 b	3.165	448.573	1.066	0.2548	2000
24 Sextantis b	1.986	452.779	1.334	0.0933	2010
94 Ceti b	1.696	453.870	1.279	0.3019	2000
HD 221287 b	3.119	456.081	1.249	0.0801	2007
HD 188015 b	1.502	456.462	1.194	0.1372	2005
HD 134606 d	0.121	459.256	1.000	0.4596	2011
HD 180902 b	1.254	464.327	1.349	0.2550	2010
HD 31253 b	0.495	465.731	1.259	0.2672	2010
HD 44219 b	0.585	472.326	1.188	0.6077	2009
HD 136418 b	2.084	478.585	1.318	0.0882	2010
Orbitar	3.876	479.086	1.191	0.3754	2009
HD 9578 b	0.623	493.615	1.269	0.0220	2009
HD 96167 b	0.682	498.901	1.346	0.7066	2009
HD 153950 b	2.734	499.366	1.279	0.3361	2008
HD 20367 b	1.169	500.032	1.251	0.3215	2002
HD 114783 b	1.058	500.647	1.199	0.1216	2001
HD 125612 b	3.007	501.548	1.275	0.4582	2007
HD 240210 b	6.856	501.750	1.309	0.1497	2009
HD 95089 b	0.866	506.812	1.449	0.1572	2010
11 Ursae Minoris b	10.480	516.222	1.517	0.0779	2009
HD 102272 c	2.610	519.645	1.563	0.6828	2008
HD 158038 b	1.766	521.007	1.343	0.2917	2011
Gliese 785 c	0.076	525.785	1.465	0.3201	2011
HD 4113 b	1.557	526.617	1.270	0.9026	2007
HD 155358 c	0.504	530.312	1.226	0.1761	2007
HD 1690 b	6.143	533.246	1.326	0.6376	2010
HD 171028 b	1.975	550.022	1.310	0.5855	2007
HD 215497 c	0.332	567.945	1.279	0.4925	2009
HD 222582 b	7.758	572.377	1.343	0.7250	1999
HD 20782 b	1.777	591.947	1.363	0.9254	2006
Amateru	7.621	594.866	1.933	0.2502	2007
Gliese 649 b	0.328	598.269	1.133	0.3046	2009
HD 10180 g	0.067	601.202	1.419	0.1853	2010
HD 164604 b	2.733	606.382	1.300	0.2426	2010
HD 206610 b	8.452	610.430	1.634	0.2289	2010
HD 65216 b	1.222	613.201	1.374	0.4140	2003
HD 200964 b	1.846	613.776	1.595	0.0400	2010
HD 7199 b	0.287	614.552	1.385	0.1866	2011
BD+20°2457 c	12.467	621.986	1.913	0.1783	2009
HD 183263 b	3.821	634.230	1.523	0.3632	2005
HD 96127 b	3.887	647.332	1.509	0.3221	2011
HD 141937 b	9.680	653.219	1.485	0.4113	2002
HD 41004 Ab	2.556	655.201	1.324	0.7422	2003
HIP 2247 b	5.096	655.579	1.338	0.5389	2008
HD 181342 b	7.946	662.897	1.823	0.1768	2010
HD 116029 b	2.126	670.193	1.582	0.1850	2011
HD 5319 b	1.942	675.002	1.748	0.1210	2007
HD 152581 b	1.525	688.758	1.482	0.0383	2011
Gliese 317 b	1.178	692.870	0.956	0.1933	2007
HD 38801 b	10.731	696.278	1.702	0.0076	2010
HD 48265 b	1.157	699.528	1.507	0.1813	2008
HD 82886 b	1.301	704.952	1.614	0.2503	2011
Eta^{2} Hydri b	6.519	711.152	1.935	0.3956	2005
NGC 2423-3 b	10.583	714.278	2.103	0.2109	2007
HD 23079 b	2.451	738.459	1.651	0.1020	2001
HD 240237 b	5.322	745.700	1.627	0.3759	2011
Nu^{2} Canis Majoris b	2.611	763.428	1.256	0.1437	2011
HD 18742 b	2.703	772.014	1.549	0.1866	2011
HD 102329 b	5.896	778.101	2.070	0.2109	2011
HD 85390 b	0.132	788.118	1.523	0.4145	2009
16 Cygni Bb	1.679	799.483	1.691	0.6886	1996
HD 200964 c	0.900	825.112	1.943	0.1811	2010
Chi Virginis b	11.089	835.477	2.249	0.4623	2009
HD 156411 b	0.742	842.212	1.882	0.2199	2009
HD 70573 b	6.089	851.832	1.766	0.4126	2007
HD 99706 b	1.416	867.895	1.962	0.3650	2011
HD 114386 b	1.340	872.220	1.620	0.2287	2004
HD 131496 b	2.185	882.830	1.807	0.1633	2011
24 Sextantis c	0.862	883.373	2.083	0.2877	2010
HD 37124 c	0.652	885.491	1.696	0.1248	2005
HD 45350 b	1.958	890.755	1.823	0.7776	2005
6 Lyncis b	2.367	898.625	2.170	0.1340	2008
Tadmor	1.603	902.876	2.039	0.1146	1988
HD 30856 b	1.839	912.128	1.774	0.2149	2011
HD 126525 b	0.224	948.121	1.923	0.1322	2011
HD 213240 b	4.725	950.847	2.019	0.4212	2001
81 Ceti b	5.347	952.745	2.545	0.2063	2008
HD 181720 b	0.374	955.568	1.844	0.2613	2009
HIP 14810 d	0.572	962.029	1.900	0.1733	2009
HD 181433 c	0.719	962.141	1.754	0.2794	2008
HD 132406 b	5.605	973.830	1.978	0.3387	2007
HD 159868 b	1.670	985.723	1.998	0.6898	2007
HD 187085 b	0.981	986.414	2.071	0.7545	2006
HD 16175 b	4.532	987.136	2.144	0.5922	2007
Arion	10.285	993.274	2.559	0.0724	2008
HD 81040 b	6.884	1001.742	1.932	0.5260	2005
HD 34445 b	0.666	1002.580	2.006	0.5714	2004
HD 147018 c	6.557	1007.543	1.918	0.1334	2009
HD 148156 b	0.855	1009.765	2.102	0.5228	2009
HD 176051 Bb	1.472	1016.083	1.761	0.0616	2010
HD 197037 b	0.789	1035.685	1.915	0.2213	2012
HD 190647 b	1.899	1038.079	2.072	0.1815	2007
HD 114386 c	1.188	1045.653	2.048	0.0559	2011
HD 143361 b	2.977	1056.638	1.999	0.1459	2008
Gliese 676 Ab	4.912	1056.782	1.810	0.3260	2009
109 Piscium b	6.825	1076.388	2.153	0.0984	1999
Taphao Thong	2.535	1078.192	2.077	0.0321	1996
HD 150433 b	0.168	1096.178	2.203	0.0103	2011
HD 28254 b	1.158	1115.512	2.146	0.8136	2009
HD 139357 b	9.755	1125.674	2.343	0.1233	2009
HD 114729 b	0.946	1131.478	2.078	0.1675	2002
HD 111232 b	6.841	1142.630	1.973	0.2403	2003
HD 170469 b	0.667	1144.553	2.240	0.1070	2007
HD 164922 b	0.360	1154.735	2.109	0.0524	2006
HD 30562 b	1.289	1157.462	2.305	0.7614	2009
HD 134060 c	0.151	1160.886	2.306	0.7544	2011
HD 2039 b	6.110	1183.358	2.176	0.6722	2002
HD 126614 Ab	0.422	1187.202	2.302	0.5869	2009
Kappa Coronae Borealis b	1.790	1191.111	2.701	0.1924	2007
HD 23127 b	1.370	1214.151	2.320	0.4407	2007
HD 73267 b	3.058	1260.300	2.199	0.2556	2008
HD 11506 b	3.437	1269.517	2.432	0.2211	2007
HD 7449 b	1.112	1275.103	2.338	0.8219	2011
HD 196050 b	2.905	1288.502	2.366	0.2277	2002
HD 175167 b	7.817	1290.183	2.396	0.5427	2010
HD 50554 b	4.384	1292.546	2.356	0.5026	2001
Rho Indi b	2.265	1293.506	2.379	0.3192	2002
HD 142245 b	1.925	1299.360	2.220	0.3078	2011
HD 8535 b	0.632	1313.457	2.448	0.1463	2009
HD 163607 c	2.287	1314.087	2.260	0.1222	2011
HD 217786 b	12.984	1318.823	2.371	0.3988	2010
HD 196885 Ab	2.585	1333.334	2.566	0.4619	2005
HD 47186 c	0.351	1353.575	2.388	0.2493	2008
Tau^{1} Gruis b	1.258	1442.919	2.692	0.0703	2002
HD 12661 c	1.834	1444.457	2.556	0.0174	2003
HD 86264 b	7.028	1474.615	2.852	0.6621	2009
HD 171238 b	2.615	1522.694	2.540	0.4001	2009
HD 86226 b	1.481	1534.439	2.620	0.7299	2010
HD 132563 Bb	1.489	1544.154	2.801	0.2220	2011
HD 23596 b	7.801	1557.960	2.846	0.2916	2002
HD 24496 Ab	0.319	1568.479	2.597	0.3016	2009
HD 113538 c	0.711	1657.422	2.431	0.3212	2010
HD 108874 c	1.064	1679.810	2.753	0.2729	2005
HD 204941 b	0.266	1733.338	2.762	0.3700	2011
14 Herculis b	5.072	1773.401	2.770	0.3378	1998
HD 73534 b	1.152	1801.372	3.154	0.0455	2009
HD 129445 b	1.587	1841.720	2.931	0.7027	2010
HD 25171 b	0.945	1844.533	3.025	0.0766	2010
HD 37124 d	0.696	1862.473	2.784	0.1569	2002
Gliese 849 b	0.821	1889.473	2.121	0.0625	2006
HD 142022 Ab	4.472	1923.238	3.020	0.5324	2005
HD 204313 b	4.048	1930.874	3.079	0.1308	2009
HD 11964 b	0.606	1940.004	3.166	0.2979	2005
HD 79498 b	1.342	1966.286	2.643	0.5870	2012
HD 66428 b	2.821	1972.505	3.220	0.4646	2006
Pi Mensae b	10.313	2048.512	3.281	0.6053	2001
HD 152079 b	2.880	2097.114	3.231	0.5977	2010
HD 169830 c	4.100	2102.476	3.604	0.3317	2003
HD 89307 b	1.776	2156.841	3.305	0.2411	2004
HD 181433 d	0.542	2171.604	3.018	0.4811	2008
HD 220689 b	1.190	2191.222	3.475	0.2018	2011
HD 27631 b	1.675	2219.866	3.161	0.1663	2011
HD 10180 h	0.203	2222.243	3.393	0.0814	2010
HD 70642 b	1.969	2230.735	3.367	0.0336	2003
HD 215456 c	0.246	2277.115	3.163	0.1866	2011
Gliese 179 b	1.071	2337.712	2.463	0.2677	2009
HD 290327 b	2.539	2442.710	3.429	0.0810	2009
HD 74156 c	8.027	2475.923	3.844	0.4337	2001
HD 47536 c	7.101	2488.746	3.525	0.1425	2007
HD 6718 b	1.654	2495.759	3.557	0.1010	2009
HD 117207 b	1.878	2627.084	3.808	0.1444	2005
HD 37605 c	3.379	2720.196	3.731	0.0129	2012
HD 87883 b	1.784	2753.998	3.599	0.5298	2009
HD 30177 b	10.525	2819.654	3.835	0.1931	2002
HD 106270 b	11.023	2888.372	4.354	0.4024	2011
Gliese 777 b	1.559	2915.411	4.043	0.3133	2002
HD 183263 c	3.723	2949.962	4.245	0.2529	2008
HD 125612 d	7.176	3007.886	4.208	0.2813	2009
HD 72659 b	3.301	3177.490	4.163	0.2693	2002
HD 154345 b	0.947	3339.667	4.195	0.0439	2006
HIP 70849 b	5.782	3387.159	3.790	0.1634	2009
HD 24040 b	4.044	3395.280	4.668	0.0682	2006
Gliese 832 b	0.638	3415.803	3.391	0.1240	2008
HD 50499 b	3.385	3618.586	5.000	0.2487	2005
HD 106515 Ab	10.547	3630.146	4.422	0.6015	2011
Gliese 433 c	0.138	3692.781	4.686	0.1666	2012
HD 220773 b	1.455	3724.655	4.612	0.5118	2012
HD 187123 c	1.989	3810.055	4.861	0.2523	1998
Upsilon Andromedae e	1.059	3848.859	5.204	0.0054	2010
HD 7449 c	2.002	4046.163	5.049	0.5344	2011
Mu^{2} Octantis b	7.134	4073.297	5.146	0.6335	2011
Mu Arae e	1.814	4205.898	5.227	0.0985	2002
HD 217107 c	2.213	4207.676	5.133	0.5549	1998
HD 13931 b	1.885	4575.836	5.439	0.0911	2009
HD 190984 b	3.078	4884.794	5.461	0.5664	2009
83 Leonis Bc	0.358	4970.102	5.349	0.1057	2010
23 Librae c	0.824	5012.874	5.821	0.1157	2009
HD 65216 c	2.243	5542.216	6.306	0.1548	2011
14 Herculis c	2.089	6906.351	6.856	0.0042	2005
HD 166724 b	4.123	8139.250	8.950	0.7732	2011
HD 98649 b	7.046	10423.717	9.377	0.8638	2011
