= List of proper names of exoplanets =

Proper names of planetary systems often follow common themes – for example, the planets of the star Copernicus are named after European astronomers

Proper names for planets outside of the Solar System – known as exoplanets – are chosen by the International Astronomical Union (IAU) through public naming contests known as NameExoWorlds.

== Naming ==
The IAU's names for exoplanets – and on most occasions their host stars – are chosen by the Executive Committee Working Group (ECWG) on Public Naming of Planets and Planetary Satellites, a group working parallel with the Working Group on Star Names (WGSN). Proper names of stars chosen by the ECWG are explicitly recognised by the WGSN. The ECWG's rules for naming exoplanets are identical to those adopted by the Minor Planet Center for minor planets. Names are a single word consisting of sixteen characters or less, pronounceable in some language, non-offensive, and not identical to existing proper names of astronomical objects. Copyrighted names, names of living individuals, and names with political or religious themes are blacklisted by the ECWG. In addition, the discoverer of a planet reserves the right to reject a proposed name for it.

== Questionable planets ==
Like the hypothesized Solar System planet Vulcan, which was named but turned out not to exist, the planetary status of a few named exoplanets has been challenged. Two have been refuted:

- Dagon, thought to be the first extrasolar planet discovered by visible-light imaging, was found in 2020 to be a debris cloud from a collision of asteroids rather than a planet.
- Orbitar, detected by radial velocity (RV), was found in 2025 to be due to intrinsic radial velocity variations in its host star.

Several others are disputed:

- Tondra was detected by radial velocity, so initially only a minimum mass was known. Its true mass is debated; a 2020 study found a mass large enough to be a star, but a 2026 study found a much smaller, planetary mass.
- Thestias, Spe, and Arkas have been questioned in the literature; they may be due to intrinsic stellar RV variations, but they have not been conclusively disproven.

== List ==
Name of planet	Eponym	Name of star	Mass (M_{J})	Radius (R_{J})	Period (days)	Semi-major axis (AU)	Discovery Method	Disc. year	Distance (ly)	Host star mass (M_{☉})	Host star temp. (K)	Remarks
Spe	"Hope" (Latin)	14 Andromedae (Veritate)	1.16	3.559	186.79	0.775	radial vel.	2008	248	0.898	4483	2015 NameExoWorlds
Arion	Ancient Greek poet	18 Delphini (Musica)	9.207		993.3	2.476	radial vel.	2008	245	2.35	5071	2015 NameExoWorlds
Arkas	Son of Zeus and Callisto in Greek myth	41 Lyncis (Intercrus)	1.654		183.93	0.648	radial vel.	2008	276	1.07	4,797	2015 NameExoWorlds
Orbitar	Neologism	42 Draconis (Fafnir)	3.88		479.1	1.19	radial vel.	2008	317.3	0.98	4200	2015 NameExoWorlds Later disproven (see text)
Taphao Thong	Thai folktale character	47 Ursae Majoris (Chalawan)	2.53		1078	2.1	radial vel.	1996	45.9	1.03	5892	2015 NameExoWorlds
Taphao Kaew	Thai folktale character	47 Ursae Majoris (Chalawan)	0.54		2391	3.6	radial vel.	2001	45.9	1.03	5892	2015 NameExoWorlds
Dimidium	"Half" (Latin)	51 Pegasi (Helvetios)	0.472		4.230785	0.0527	radial vel.	1995	50.1	1.12	5793	First exoplanet discovered orbiting a main-sequence star 2015 NameExoWorlds
Galileo	Italian astronomer	55 Cancri A (Copernicus)	0.8306		14.65152	0.115227	radial vel.	1996	40.9	0.91	5196	2015 NameExoWorlds
Brahe	Danish astronomer	55 Cancri A (Copernicus)	0.1714		44.4175	0.241376	radial vel.	2004	40.9	0.91	5196	2015 NameExoWorlds
Lipperhey	Dutch lensmaker	55 Cancri A (Copernicus)	3.878		4825	5.503	radial vel.	2002	40.9	0.91	5196	2015 NameExoWorlds
Janssen	Dutch astronomer	55 Cancri A (Copernicus)	0.02542	0.17	0.736539	0.01544	radial vel.	2004	40.9	0.91	5196	2015 NameExoWorlds
Harriot	English astronomer	55 Cancri A (Copernicus)	0.141		262	0.788	radial vel.	2007	40.9	0.91	5196	2015 NameExoWorlds
Ægir	God of the sea in Norse mythology	Epsilon Eridani (Ran)	1.55		2502	3.39	radial vel.	2000	10.5	0.83		2015 NameExoWorlds
Amateru	Amaterasu, Japanese sun goddess	Epsilon Tauri (Ain)	7.6		594.9	1.93	radial vel.	2006	155.0	2.7	4901	2015 NameExoWorlds
Dagon	Fertility god of Levantine mythology	Fomalhaut A			555530	160	imaging	2008	25.1	2		2015 NameExoWorlds Later disproven (see text)
Tadmor	Ancient Palmyrene Aramaic and modern Arabic name for Palmyra	Gamma Cephei A (Errai)	1.85		903.3	2.05	radial vel.	2003	45.0	1.4		2015 NameExoWorlds
Meztli	Aztec god of the night and moon	HD 104985 (Tonatiuh)	6.33		199.505	0.95	radial vel.	2003	332.8	1.6	4786	2015 NameExoWorlds
Smertrios	Gallic deity, sometimes equated with Roman Mars	HD 149026 (Ogma)	0.368	0.813	2.8758911		radial vel.	2005	257.2	1.34	6160	2015 NameExoWorlds
Hypatia	Female Greek astronomer and philosopher	Iota Draconis (Edasich)	8.82		511.098	1.275	radial vel.	2002	102.2	1.05	4530	2015 NameExoWorlds
Quijote	Characters from Don Quixote	Mu Arae (Cervantes)	1.676		643.25	1.497	radial vel.	2000	49.8	1.08	5807	2015 NameExoWorlds
Dulcinea	Characters from Don Quixote	Mu Arae (Cervantes)	0.03321		9.63	0.09094	radial vel.	2004	49.8	1.08	5807	2015 NameExoWorlds
Rocinante	Characters from Don Quixote	Mu Arae (Cervantes)	0.5219		310.55	0.921	radial vel.	2004	49.8	1.08	5807	2015 NameExoWorlds
Sancho	Characters from Don Quixote	Mu Arae (Cervantes)	1.814		4205.8	5.235	radial vel.	2006	49.8	1.08	5807	2015 NameExoWorlds
Thestias	Greek myth	Pollux	2.3		589.64	1.64	radial vel.	2006	33.7	2.1	4946	2015 NameExoWorlds
Saffar	Muslim astronomer	Upsilon Andromedae (Titawin)	0.6876		4.617033	0.059222	radial vel.	1996	43.9	1.3		2015 NameExoWorlds
Samh	Muslim astronomer	Upsilon Andromedae (Titawin)	1.981		241.258	0.827774	radial vel.	1999	43.9	1.3		2015 NameExoWorlds
Majriti	Muslim astronomer	Upsilon Andromedae (Titawin)	10.25		1276.46	2.51329	radial vel.	1999	43.9	1.3		2015 NameExoWorlds
Fortitudo	"Fortitude" (Latin)	Xi Aquilae (Libertas)	2.8		136.75	0.68	radial vel.	2007	204.4	2.2	4780	2015 NameExoWorlds
Draugr	Norse myth	PSR B1257+12 (Lich)	6.29×10^{−5}		25.262	0.19	timing	1994	2300	1.4	28,856	2015 NameExoWorlds
Poltergeist	German folklore	PSR B1257+12 (Lich)	0.0135		66.5419	0.36	timing	1992	2300	1.4	28,856	2015 NameExoWorlds
Phobetor	Greek myth	PSR B1257+12 (Lich)	0.0123		98.2114	0.46	timing	1992	2300	1.4	28,856	2015 NameExoWorlds
Arber	Name for inhabitants of Albania during the Middle Ages	HD 82886 (Illyrian)	1.3		705	1.65	radial vel.	2011	407.7	2.53	4953	2019 NameExoWorlds Albania
Tassili	Tassili n'Ajjer UNESCO World Heritage Site	HD 28678 (Hoggar)	1.7		387.1	1.24	radial vel.	2011	622.7	1.74	5076	2019 NameExoWorlds Algeria
Madriu	Madriu-Perafita-Claror Valley UNESCO World Heritage Site	HD 131496 (Arcalís)	2.2		883	2.09	radial vel.	2011	358.8	1.61	4927	2019 NameExoWorlds Andorra
Naqaỹa	"brother-family-relative" in the Mocoví language	HD 48265 (Nosaxa)	1.16		700	1.51	radial vel.	2008	285	0.93		2019 NameExoWorlds Argentina
Bocaprins	Boca Prins beach in Arikok National Park	WASP-39 (Malmok)	0.28	1.27	4.055259	0.0486	transit	2011	750.2	0.93	5400	2019 NameExoWorlds Aruba
Yanyan	"boy" in the Boon wurrung language	HD 38283 (Bubup)	0.34		363.2	1.02	radial vel.	2011	123	1.085	5945	2019 NameExoWorlds Australia
Sissi	Character from the 1955 Austrian film Sissi	HAT-P-14 (Franz)	1.150	1.2	4.627657	0.0594	transit	2010	668.6	1.386	6600	2019 NameExoWorlds Austria
Ganja	Ancient capital of Azerbaijan	HD 152581 (Mahsati)	1.5		689	1.48	radial vel.	2011	606.7	0.927	5155	2019 NameExoWorlds Azerbaijan
Tondra	"nap" in Bengali	HD 148427 (Timir)	0.96		331.5	0.93	radial vel.	2009	193	1.45	5052	2019 NameExoWorlds Bangladesh
Eburonia	The Eburones, a prominent Celtic tribe	HD 49674 (Nervia)	0.1	0.98	4.94739	0.058	radial vel.	2002	133	1.07	5482	2019 NameExoWorlds Belgium
Drukyul	Native name of Bhutan	HD 73534 (Gakyid)	1.15		1800	3.15	radial vel.	2009	316.3	1.29	4952	2019 NameExoWorlds Bhutan
Yvaga	"paradise" in the Guaraní language	HD 63765 (Tapecue)	0.64		358	0.949	radial vel.	2009	106	0.865	5432	2019 NameExoWorlds Bolivia
Naron	Ancient Celtic name for the Neretva river in the Balkans	HD 206610 (Bosona)	2.2		610	1.68	radial vel.	2010	632.7	1.56	4874	2019 NameExoWorlds Bosnia and Herzegovina
Guarani	Guaraní people of southern Brazil, Paraguay, Uruguay, and Argentina	HD 23079 (Tupi)	2.45		730.6	1.596	radial vel.	2001	114	1.1	5848	2019 NameExoWorlds Brazil
Mastika	"gem/jewel" in Malay	HD 179949 (Gumala)	0.92	1.05	3.0925	0.045	radial vel.	2000	88.1	1.28	6260	2019 NameExoWorlds Brunei
Bendida	Bendis, a Thracian goddess	WASP-21 (Tangra)	0.3	1.21	4.3225126	0.052	transit	2010	750.2	1.01	5800	2019 NameExoWorlds Bulgaria
Nakanbé	Nakanbé river in Burkina Faso and Ghana	HD 30856 A (Mouhoun)	1.8		912	2.0	radial vel.	2011	385.2	1.35	4982	2019 NameExoWorlds Burkina Faso
Awasis	"child" in the Cree language of Canada	HD 136418 (Nikawiy)	2.0		464.3	1.32	radial vel.	2010	320	1.33	5071	2019 NameExoWorlds Canada
Caleuche	Ghost ship from the Chilote mythology of southern Chile	HD 164604 (Pincoya)	1.998		641.47	1.331	radial vel.	2010	129	0.77	4684	2019 NameExoWorlds Chile
Wangshu	Chinese goddess of the moon	HD 173416 (Xihe)	2.7		323.6	1.16	radial vel.	2009	440.3	2.0	4683	2019 NameExoWorlds China
Melquíades	Character from the novel One Hundred Years of Solitude by Gabriel García Márquez	HD 93083 (Macondo)	0.37		143.58	0.477	radial vel.	2005	94.3	0.7	4995	2019 NameExoWorlds Colombia
Pipitea	Small pearls found in Penrhyn lagoon	HD 221287 (Poerava)	3.09		456.1	1.25	radial vel.	2007	173	1.25	6304	2019 NameExoWorlds Cook Islands
Ditsö̀	Name given to the first Bribri people by the god Sibö̀ in Talamancan mythology	WASP-17 (Diwö)	0.486	1.991	3.735438	0.0515	transit	2009	1338.57	1.2	6650	2019 NameExoWorlds Costa Rica
Asye	Earth goddess from Akan mythology	WASP-15 (Nyamien)	0.542	1.428	3.7520656	0.0499	transit	2008	1005	1.18	6300	2019 NameExoWorlds Côte d'Ivoire
Veles	Veles, Slavic deity of earth, waters, and the underworld	HD 75898 (Stribor)	2.51		418.2	1.19	radial vel.	2007	262.8	1.28	6021	2019 NameExoWorlds Croatia
Finlay	Carlos Finlay, Cuban epidemiologist	BD−17 63 (Felixvarela)	5.1		655.6	1.34	radial vel.	2008	113	0.74	4714	2019 NameExoWorlds Cuba
Onasilos	Oldest recorded doctor in Cyprus	HD 168746 (Alasia)	0.23		6.403	0.065	radial vel.	2002	140.6	0.88	5610	2019 NameExoWorlds Cyprus
Makropulos	Věc Makropulos by Czech playwright Karel Čapek	XO-5 (Absolutno)	1.077	1.03	4.1877537	0.0487	transit	2008	831.7	0.88	5510	2019 NameExoWorlds Czechia
Surt	Ruler of Muspelheim from Norse mythology	HAT-P-29 (Muspelheim)	0.778	1.107	5.723186	0.0667	transit	2011	1050	1.207	6087	2019 NameExoWorlds Denmark
Boinayel	Boinayel, god of rain from Taíno mythology	WASP-6 (Márohu)	0.503	1.224	3.361006	0.0421	transit	2008	651	0.888	5450	2019 NameExoWorlds Dominican Republic
Eyeke	"near" in the Waorani language	HD 6434 (Nenque)	0.39		21.998	0.14	radial vel.	2000	131.5	0.79	5835	2019 NameExoWorlds Ecuador
Cayahuanca	"rock looking at the stars" in Nahuatl	HD 52265 (Citalá)	1.21		119.27	0.52	radial vel.	2000	91	1.2	6159	2019 NameExoWorlds El Salvador
Hämarik	"twilight" in Estonian	XO-4 (Koit)	1.616	1.317	4.12473	0.05485	transit	2008	955.6	1.32	5700	2019 NameExoWorlds Estonia
Abol	First of three rounds in Ethiopian traditional coffee ceremony	HD 16175 (Buna)	4.8		996.4	2.2	radial vel.	2009	196	1.34	6048	2019 NameExoWorlds Ethiopia
Hiisi	Sacred localities and evil spirits from Finnic mythology	HAT-P-38 (Horna)	0.267	0.825	4.640382	0.0523	transit	2012	812.1	0.886	5330	2019 NameExoWorlds Finland
Bélisama	Belisama, Gaulish goddess likened to the Roman Minerva	HD 8574 (Bélénos)	2.11		227.55	0.77	radial vel.	2003	144	1.17	6080	2019 NameExoWorlds France
Mintome	Fang word for a mythical land where a brotherhood of brave men live	HD 208487 (Itonda)	0.413		129.8	0.51	radial vel.	2004	147	1.3	5929	2019 NameExoWorlds Gabon
Neri	Neri River in southern Ethiopia	HD 32518 (Mago)	3.04		157.54	0.59	radial vel.	2009	382.9	1.13	4580	2019 NameExoWorlds Germany
Toge	"earring" in the Ewe language	HD 181720 (Sika)	0.37		956.0	1.78	radial vel.	2009	183	0.92	5781	2019 NameExoWorlds Ghana
Iolaus	Nephew of Heracles from Greek mythology	HAT-P-42 (Lerna)	0.975	1.277	4.641876	0.0575	transit	2012	1458	1.179	5743	2019 NameExoWorlds Greece
Koyopaʼ	"lightning" in the Kʼicheʼ language	WASP-22 (Tojil)	0.617	1.199	3.5327313	0.04698	transit	2010	978.5	1.1	6000	2019 NameExoWorlds Guatemala
Indépendance	Haitian Declaration of Independence	HD 1502 (Citadelle)	2.75	1.183	428.5	1.262	radial vel.	2011	518.6	1.46	4947	2019 NameExoWorlds Haiti
Ixbalanqué	One of twin gods who became the Moon in K'iche' mythology	HD 98219 (Hunaphú)	1.8		436.9	1.23	radial vel.	2011	437.0	1.3	4992	2019 NameExoWorlds Honduras
Victoriapeak	Victoria Peak, a hill on Hong Kong Island	HD 212771 (Lionrock)	2.3		373.3	1.22	radial vel.	2010	427.3	1.15	5121	2019 NameExoWorlds Hong Kong
Magor	Ancestor of the Magyars in Hungarian mythology	HAT-P-2 (Hunor)	8.74	0.951	5.6334729	0.0674	transit	2007	384.9	1.34	6414	2019 NameExoWorlds Hungary
Fold	"earth/soil" in Old Icelandic	HD 109246 (Funi)	0.77		68.27	0.33	radial vel.	2010	214	1.01	5844	2019 NameExoWorlds Iceland
Santamasa	"clouded" in Sanskrit	HD 86081 A (Bibhā)	1.5	1.08	1.99809	0.039	radial vel.	2006	297	1.21	6028	2019 NameExoWorlds India
Noifasui	"revolve around" in the Nias language	HD 117618 (Dofida)	0.174		25.8	0.18	radial vel.	2004	124	1.05	5861	2019 NameExoWorlds Indonesia
Kavian	"relating to Kaveh" from the epic poem Shahnameh by Persian poet Ferdowsi	HD 175541 (Kaveh)	0.61		297.3	1.03	radial vel.	2007	417.5	1.65	5060	2019 NameExoWorlds Iran
Babylonia	Kingdom in ancient Mesopotamia	HD 231701 (Uruk)	1.08		141.89	0.53	radial vel.	2007	353.6	1.14	6208	2019 NameExoWorlds Iraq
Bran	Canine son of Tuiren and cousin of hero Fionn mac Cumhaill from Irish mythology	HAT-P-36 (Tuiren)	1.832	1.264	1.327347	0.0238	transit	2012	1034	1.022	5580	2019 NameExoWorlds Ireland
Alef	First letter of the Hebrew alphabet	HAT-P-9 (Tevel)	0.67	1.4	3.922814	0.053	transit	2008	1566	1.28	6350	2019 NameExoWorlds Israel
Lete	Italian spelling of Lethe, the underworld river of fog from Greek mythology	HD 102195 (Flegetonte)	0.46		4.113775	0.049	radial vel.	2005	94.52	0.926	5291	2019 NameExoWorlds Italy
Chura	"natural beauty" in the Ryukyuan and Okinawan languages	HD 145457 (Kamuy)	2.9		176.3	0.76	radial vel.	2010	411.0	1.9	4757	2019 NameExoWorlds Japan
Wadirum	Wadi Rum, largest valley in Jordan	WASP-80 (Petra)	0.554	0.952	3.0678504	0.0346	transit	2013	196	0.58	4145	2019 NameExoWorlds Jordan
Buru	"dust" in the Dholuo language	HD 83443 (Kalausi)	0.4	1.04	2.98572	0.0406	radial vel.	2002	142.0	0.9	5460	2019 NameExoWorlds Kenya
Staburags	Rock with symbolic meaning from the Latvian poem "Staburags un Liesma"	HD 118203 (Liesma)	2.173	1.133	6.13498	0.07082	radial vel.	2005	289	1.23	5600	2019 NameExoWorlds Latvia
Beirut	Capital and largest city in Lebanon	HD 192263 (Phoenicia)	0.733		24.3587	0.15312	radial vel.	1999	64.9	0.81	4965	2019 NameExoWorlds Lebanon
Umbäässa	"small ant" in the Triesenberg dialect of southern Liechtenstein	TrES-3 (Pipoltr)	1.91	1.305	1.30618608	0.0226	transit	2007	1219.51	0.924	5720	2019 NameExoWorlds Liechtenstein
Vytis	Vytis, the coat of arms and national symbol of Lithuania	HAT-P-40 (Taika)	0.615	1.73	4.457243	0.0608	transit	2012	1634	1.512	6080	2019 NameExoWorlds Lithuania
Peitruss	Pétrusse river in Luxembourg	HD 45350 (Lucilinburhuc)	1.79		890.76	1.92	radial vel.	2004	160	1.02	5754	2019 NameExoWorlds Luxembourg
Trimobe	Rich ogre from Malagasy mythology	HD 153950 (Rapeto)	2.73		499.4	1.28	radial vel.	2008	162	1.12	6076	2019 NameExoWorlds Madagascar
Baiduri	"opal" in Malay	HD 20868 (Intan)	1.99		380.85	0.947	radial vel.	2008	160	0.78	4795	2019 NameExoWorlds Malaysia
Ġgantija	Megalithic temple complex on the Maltese island of Gozo	HAT-P-34 (Sansuna)	3.328	1.107	5.452654	0.0677	transit	2012	838	1.36	6509	2019 NameExoWorlds Malta
Cuptor	Baking and drying chamber formerly used in Mauritius	WASP-72 (Diya)	1.461	1.27	2.2167421	0.03708	transit	2013	1108	1.386	6250	2019 NameExoWorlds Mauritius
Xólotl	"animal" in Nahuatl; god of fire and lightning in Aztec mythology	HD 224693 (Axólotl)	0.71		26.73	0.233	radial vel.	2006	307	1.33	6037	2019 NameExoWorlds Mexico
Isli	Lake in the Atlas Mountains of Morocco	WASP-161 (Tislit)	2.49	1.143	5.4060425	0.0673	transit	2018	1129.976	1.71		2019 NameExoWorlds Morocco
Hairu	"unity" in the Makhuwa language	HD 7199 (Emiw)	0.29		615.0	1.36	radial vel.	2011	117	0.89	5386	2019 NameExoWorlds Mozambique
Bagan	Bagan, ancient city in Myanmar	HD 18742 (Ayeyarwady)	3.4	1.166	766.0	1.82	radial vel.	2011	440	1.36	4940	2019 NameExoWorlds Myanmar
Laligurans	"rhododendron" in the Nepali language	HD 100777 (Sagarmatha)	1.16		383.7	1.03	radial vel.	2007	172	1.0	5582	2019 NameExoWorlds Nepal
Nachtwacht	The Night Watch, painting by Rembrandt	HAT-P-6 (Sterrennacht)	1.057	1.33	3.853003	0.05235	transit	2007	650	1.29	6570	2019 NameExoWorlds Netherlands
Kererū	Māori name for the New Zealand pigeon	HD 137388 (Karaka)	0.223		330.0	0.89	radial vel.	2011	124	0.86	5240	2019 NameExoWorlds New Zealand
Xolotlan	Second largest lake in Nicaragua	HD 4208 (Cocibolca)	0.804		828.0	1.65	radial vel.	2001	111	0.87	5571	2019 NameExoWorlds Nicaragua
Equiano	Olaudah Equiano, Nigerian writer and abolitionist	HD 43197 (Amadioha)	0.6		327.8	0.92	radial vel.	2009	179	0.96	5508	2019 NameExoWorlds Nigeria
Albmi	"sky" in the Northern Sami language	HD 68988 (Násti)	1.86		6.2771	0.0704	radial vel.	2001	189	1.2	5767	2019 NameExoWorlds Norway
Perwana	"moth" in Urdu	HD 99109 (Shama)	2.09	1.386	1.212884	0.0232	transit	2010	1280	1.13	5924	2019 NameExoWorlds Pakistan
Jebus	Ancient name of Jerusalem	HAT-P-23 (Moriah)	0.502		439.3	1.105	radial vel.	2006	197	0.93	5272	2019 NameExoWorlds Palestine
Pollera	Traditional women's costume for the El Punto dance of Panama	WASP-79 (Montuno)	0.9	1.7	3.6623817	0.0539	transit	2012	780	1.56	6600	2019 NameExoWorlds Panama
Tumearandu	Son of the original man and woman of the universe in Guaraní mythology	HD 108147 (Tupã)	0.261		10.8985	0.102	radial vel.	2002	125.8	1.19	6067	2019 NameExoWorlds Paraguay
Sumajmajta	Character from "Way to the Sun" by Peruvian writer Abraham Valdelomar	HD 156411 (Inquill)	0.74		842.2	1.88	radial vel.	2009	180	1.25	5900	2019 NameExoWorlds Peru
Haik	Successor to Aman Sinaya as god of the sea in Tagalog mythology	WASP-34 (Amansinaya)	0.59	1.22	4.3176782	0.0524	transit	2010	390	1.01	5700	2019 NameExoWorlds Philippines
Leklsullun	"child/children" in the Pitkern language	HD 102117 (Uklun)	0.172		20.67	0.1532	radial vel.	2004	140	1.03	5672	2019 NameExoWorlds Pitcairn Islands
Pirx	Character from the books of Polish author Stanisław Lem	BD+14 4559 (Solaris)	1.47		268.94	0.777	radial vel.	2009	160	0.86	5008	2019 NameExoWorlds Poland
Viriato	Viriathus, leader of the Lusitanian people that resisted Roman expansion	HD 45652 (Lusitânia)	0.47		43.6	0.23	radial vel.	2008	120	0.83	5312	2019 NameExoWorlds Portugal
Aumatex	God of the wind in Taíno mythology	HIP 12961 (Koeia)	0.35		57.435	0.13	radial vel.	2009	75	0.67		2019 NameExoWorlds Puerto Rico
Negoiu	Second highest peak in the Romanian Făgăraș mountain range	XO-1 (Moldoveanu)	0.9	1.184	3.9415128	0.0488	transit	2006	536	1.0	5738	2019 NameExoWorlds Romania
Teberda	Teberda River in the Dombay region of Russia	HAT-P-3 (Dombay)	0.591	0.827	2.899703	0.03866	transit	2007	420	0.917	5224	2019 NameExoWorlds Russia
Dopere	North Senegalese area containing the water source of Belel	HD 181342 (Belel)	2.54	1.19	564.1	1.592	radial vel.	2010	360.7	1.69	4945	2019 NameExoWorlds Senegal
Vlasina	Vlasina River in southeastern Serbia	WASP-60 (Morava)	0.5	0.9	4.3		transit	2011	1000	1.078	5900	2019 NameExoWorlds Serbia
Viculus	"little village" in Latin	WASP-32 (Parumleo)	3.6	1.18	2.71865	0.0394	transit	2010	795	1.1	6100	2019 NameExoWorlds Singapore
Kráľomoc	"Jupiter" in ancient Slovak	HAT-P-5 (Chasoň)	1.06	1.252	2.788491	0.04079	transit	2007	1100	1.163	5960	2019 NameExoWorlds Slovakia
Iztok	Character from Pod svobodnim soncem by Slovene author Fran Saleški Finžgar	WASP-38 (Irena)	2.712	1.079	6.871815	0.07551	transit	2010	360	1.216	6150	2019 NameExoWorlds Slovenia
Krotoa	!Uriǁ'aeǀona translator, community builder, and educator during the founding of the Cape Colony	WASP-62 (Naledi)	0.57	1.39	4.411953	0.0567	transit	2011	520	1.25	6230	2019 NameExoWorlds South Africa
Halla	Highest mountain in South Korea	8 UMi (Baekdu)	1.5		93.4	0.49	radial vel.	2015	518.91	1.8	4847.4	2019 NameExoWorlds South Korea
Riosar	Sar River in Spain, featured in the works of Galician poet Rosalía de Castro	HD 149143 (Rosalíadecastro)	1.33	1.05	4.07206	0.052	radial vel.	2005	210	1.1	5730	2019 NameExoWorlds Spain
Samagiya	"togetherness/unity" in the Sinhalese language	HD 205739 (Sāmaya)	1.37		279.8	0.896	radial vel.	2008	295	1.22	6176	2019 NameExoWorlds Sri Lanka
Isagel	Character from Aniara by Swedish poet Harry Martinson	HD 102956 (Aniara)	0.96		6.495	0.081	radial vel.	2010	411	1.68	5054	2019 NameExoWorlds Sweden
Eiger	Prominent peak in the Bernese Alps	HD 130322 (Mönch)	1.05		10.72	0.088	radial vel.	1999	98	0.79	5330	2019 NameExoWorlds Switzerland
Ugarit	City where scribes devised the Ugaritic alphabet	HD 218566 (Ebla)	0.21		225.7	0.6873	radial vel.	2010	97.65	0.85	4820	2019 NameExoWorlds Syria
Sazum	Traditional name of Yuchi Township in Nantou County, Taiwan	HD 100655 (Formosa)	1.7		157.57	0.76	radial vel.	2011	397.9	2.4	4861	2019 NameExoWorlds Taiwan
Tanzanite	Tanzanite mineral	WASP-71 (Mpingo)	2.258	1.5	2.9036747	0.04631	transit	2012	700	1.572	6050	2019 NameExoWorlds Tanzania
Maeping	Ping River in Thailand	WASP-50 (Chaophraya)	1.437	1.138	1.9550959	0.02913	transit	2011	750	0.861	5400	2019 NameExoWorlds Thailand
Agouto	Highest mountain in Togo	WASP-64 (Atakoraka)	1.2	0.7	1.6		transit	2011	1219.51	0.99	5550	2019 NameExoWorlds Togo
Ramajay	"to sing and make music" in Trinidadian Creole	HD 96063 (Dingolay)	0.9		361.1	0.99	radial vel.	2011	515	1.02	5148	2019 NameExoWorlds Trinidad and Tobago
Khomsa	Palm-shaped amulet popular in Tunisia	HD 192699 (Chechia)	2.096	1.206	340.94	1.063	radial vel.	2007	220	1.38	5041	2019 NameExoWorlds Tunisia
Göktürk	Turkic peoples who established the First Turkic Khaganate	WASP-52 (Anadolu)	0.46	1.27	1.7497798	0.0272	transit	2011	460	0.87	5000	2019 NameExoWorlds Turkey
Tryzub	Tryzub, golden trident on the coat of arms of Ukraine	HAT-P-15 (Berehynia)	1.946	1.072	10.863502	0.0964	transit	2010	620	1.013	5568	2019 NameExoWorlds Ukraine
Barajeel	Wind tower used to re-direct wind flow as a form of air conditioning	HIP 79431 (Sharjah)	2.1		111.7	0.36	radial vel.	2010	47.0	0.49	3191	2019 NameExoWorlds United Arab Emirates
Cruinlagh	"to orbit" in Manx Gaelic	WASP-13 (Gloas)	0.485	1.365	4.353011	0.05379	transit	2008	509	1.03	5826	2019 NameExoWorlds United Kingdom
Mulchatna	Mulchatna River in southwestern Alaska, United States	HD 17156 (Nushagak)	3.195	1.095	21.2163979	0.1623	transit	2007	255.2	1.275	6079	2019 NameExoWorlds United States
Ibirapitá	Tree native to Uruguay, Argentina, and Brazil	HD 63454 (Ceibo)	0.39	1.06	2.81747	0.036	radial vel.	2005	117	0.8	4841	2019 NameExoWorlds Uruguay
Madalitso	"blessings" in the Nyanja language	HD 85390 (Natasha)	0.099		799.52	1.373	radial vel.	2009	110.8	0.76	5186	2019 NameExoWorlds Zambia
Bambaruush	"bear cub" in Mongolian	HAT-P-21 (Mazaalai)	4.87	1.11	4.12448	0.0494	transit	2010	911.6	1.24	5588	2019 NameExoWorlds Mongolia
Tahay	Chilean wildflower	Gliese 367 (Añañuca)	0.00172	0.0641	0.321962	0.0071	transit	2021	30.7	0.454	3522	2022 NameExoWorlds Chile
Awohali	"eagle" in Cherokee	Gliese 436 (Noquisi)	0.070	0.372	2.64388312	0.0291	radial vel.	2004	31.9	0.47	3586	2022 NameExoWorlds United States
Su	"fire" in Basque	Gliese 486 (Gar)	0.00887	0.1164	1.467119	0.01734	radial vel.	2021	26.4	0.323	3340	2022 NameExoWorlds Spain
Enaiposha	term for a large body of water in Maa	GJ 1214 (Orkaria)	0.0257	0.2446	1.58040433	0.01490	transit	2009	47.8	0.178	3250	2022 NameExoWorlds Kenya
Phailinsiam	"sapphire" in Thai	GJ 3470 (Kaewkosin)	0.0437	0.408	3.3366496	0.0355	radial vel.	2012	95.9	0.539	3600	2022 NameExoWorlds Thailand
Puli	Hungarian dog breed	HAT-P-12 (Komondor)	0.211	0.959	3.2130598	0.0384	transit	2009	463	0.733	4650	2022 NameExoWorlds Hungary
Guataubá	Taíno mythological figure	HAT-P-26 (Guahayona)	0.07	0.63	4.234520	0.0479	transit	2010	466	1.12	5079	2022 NameExoWorlds Puerto Rico
Zembretta	Tunisian island	HATS-72 (Zembra)	0.1254	0.7224	7.3279474	0.066517	transit	2020	413	0.7311	4656	2022 NameExoWorlds Tunisia
Levantes	Greek word for easterly Mediterranean winds	HD 95086 (Aiolos)	5			55.7	imaging	2013	282	1.6	7595	2022 NameExoWorlds Greece
Najsakopajk	"Mother Earth" in the Zoque language	HIP 65426 (Matza)	9.0	1.5		92	imaging	2017	351	1.96	8840	2022 NameExoWorlds Mexico
Qingluan	Chinese mythical bird	L 168-9 (Danfeng)	0.0145	0.124	1.40150	0.02091	transit	2020	82.1	0.62	3800	2022 NameExoWorlds China
Kuaꞌkua	"butterfly" in the Bribri language	LHS 3844 (Batsũ̀)		0.1162	0.46292913	0.00622	transit	2018	48.5	0.151	3036	2022 NameExoWorlds Costa Rica
Cuancoá	name for the morning star in the U'wa language	LTT 9779 (Uúba)	0.09225	0.421	0.7920520	0.01679	transit	2020	264.3	0.770	5443	2022 NameExoWorlds Colombia
Banksia	genus of plants	WASP-19 (Wattle)	1.154	1.415	0.78883852	0.01652	transit	2009	869	0.965	5616	2022 NameExoWorlds Australia
Astrolábos	astrolabe	WASP-43 (Gnomon)	1.78	0.93	0.813475	0.0142	transit	2011	284.3	0.58	4400	2022 NameExoWorlds Romania
Regoč	character from Croatian Tales of Long Ago	WASP-63 (Kosjenka)	0.37	1.41	4.378080	0.0574	transit	2012	942	1.28	5550	2022 NameExoWorlds Croatia
Makombé	river in Cameroon	WASP-69 (Wouri)	0.29	1.11	3.868140	0.04525	transit	2013	164	0.980	4700	2022 NameExoWorlds Cameroon
Tylos	ancient Greek name for Bahrain	WASP-121 (Dilmun)	1.157	1.753	1.27492504	0.02596	transit	2015	858	1.358	6776	2022 NameExoWorlds Bahrain
Catalineta	character from Mallorcan folktale	WASP-166 (Filetdor)	0.101	0.63	5.443540	0.0641	transit	2018	373	1.19	6050	2022 NameExoWorlds Spain
Ahra	"ocean" in Korean	WD 0806−661 (Maru)	8			2500	imaging	2011	62.7	0.62	9552	2022 NameExoWorlds South Korea

== See also ==
- List of exoplanets
- List of proper names of stars
