= Bagan (disambiguation) =

Bagan is an ancient city located in Myanmar.

Bagan may also refer to:

- Bagan Kingdom
- Bagan, Johor, Malaysia
- Bagan, Bagansky District, Novosibirsk Oblast, Russia
- Bagan (river), Novosibirsk Oblast, Russia
- Bagan (lake), Novosibirsk Oblast, Russia
- Bagansiapiapi, Riau Province, Indonesia
- Bagan, IAU-approved proper name of exoplanet HD 18742 b, orbiting star Ayeyarwady (HD 18742) in Eridanus
- Bagan (federal constituency), represented in the Dewan Rakyat
- Bagan, a Toho Studios Daikaiju (Giant Strange Monster) appearing in Godzilla-related media and a proposed but unrealized opponent to Godzilla in several films.

== People with the surname ==
- David Bagan (born 1977), Scottish footballer
- Joel Bagan (born 2001), English footballer

== See also ==
- Pagan (disambiguation)
