= Danfeng =

Danfeng may refer to:

- Danfeng County, in Shangluo, Shaanxi, China
- Danfeng Station, station on Taipei Rapid Transit System, located in Taipei County, Taiwan
- Danfeng, star in the constellation Tucana
