= HD 30856 =

K-type subgiant star in the constellation Pisces

HD 30856 / Mouhoun
- Location of HD 30856 (circled)

Observation data Epoch J2000.0 Equinox ICRS
- Constellation: Eridanus
- Right ascension: 04^{h} 50^{m} 17.86144^{s}
- Declination: −24° 22′ 07.8338″
- Apparent magnitude (V): 7.911

Characteristics
- Evolutionary stage: Red-giant branch star
- Spectral type: K0III
- B−V color index: 0.961

Astrometry
Radial velocity (R_{v})	35.71 km/s
Proper motion (μ)	RA: 18.469 mas/yr Dec.: −19.837 mas/yr
Parallax (π)	7.5965±0.0179 mas
Distance	429 ± 1 ly (131.6 ± 0.3 pc)

Orbit
Primary	HD 30856 A
Secondary	HD 30856 B
Semi-major axis (a)	0.786″

Details

HD 30856 A
Mass	1.17 / 1.35 M_{☉}
Radius	4.40 R_{☉}
Luminosity	9.9±0.5 L_{☉}
Surface gravity (log g)	3.20 cgs
Temperature	4895 / 4982 ± 44 K
Metallicity [Fe/H]	−0.06±0.03 dex
Rotational velocity (v sin i)	2.85 km/s

HD 30856 B
Mass	0.54±0.01 M_{☉}
Surface gravity (log g)	4.7 cgs
Temperature	3700–4150 K

Other designations
- CD−24 2616, HD 30856, HIP 22491, SAO 169805, TIC 612908, TYC 6466-1769-1, GSC 06466-01769, 2MASS J04501787-2422077, Gaia DR3 4893980371818915456

Database references
SIMBAD	data

HD 30856 (proper name Mouhoun) is a binary system between HD 30856 A (often simply HD 30856), a K-type giant star, and HD 30856 B, a red dwarf companion, located in the constellation of Eridanus about 430 light-years distant. A super-Jupiter exoplanet, HD 30856 b (proper name Nakanbé), is known to orbit the primary star.

== Stellar characteristics ==
HD 30856 A is an evolved star in the red-giant branch, with a spectral type of K0 III, a radius of 4.4 R_{☉}, and a mass of 1.17 M_{☉}. The surface temperature of HD 30856 is estimated to be about 4,895 K, which gives it an orange color. The star is roughly 10 times as bright as the Sun, which, combined with a distance of 429 light-years, places its apparent magnitude at 7.91, too dim to be visible from Earth by the naked eye. The star is aged approximately 3.8 billion years, making it younger than the Sun (4.6 billion years old).

=== Companion star ===
Through the use of adaptive optics, observations at the Keck II telescope in Hawaii revealed the existence of another star, designated HD 30856 B, about 0.8 arcseconds east-southeast of HD 30856. HD 30856 B has a mass of 0.54 M_{☉} and a temperature of 3700–4150 K, (Note: The source publication provides three separate estimates, namely 3940 ± 200 K, 3945 ± 70 K, and 3731 ± 29 K.) typical for an M0V–M1V red dwarf. (Note: According to the listed sources, typical M0V and M1V stars have masses of 0.57 / 0.54 M_{☉} and surface temperatures of 3850 / 3660 K, respectively.)

Since the star shares a very similar proper motion with HD 30856 A, the two stars are believed to be in a binary system. HD 30856 B revolves around the primary star (A) in a wide orbit, with a semi-major axis of 93 ± 8 AU.

== Nomenclature ==
In 2019, the People's Republic of Burkina Faso was assigned to giving the HD 30856 A system a proper name as part of the IAU100 NameExoWorlds Project, planned to celebrate the hundredth anniversary of the International Astronomical Union (IAU), which grants the right to name an exoplanetary system to every state and territory in the world. Names were submitted and selected within Burkina Faso, which were then presented to the IAU to be officially recognized. On 17 December 2019, the IAU announced that HD 30856 A and its planet, b, were named Mouhoun and Nakanbé, respectively.

Mouhoun is named after the Black Volta (locally called Mouhoun), Burkina Faso's largest river that serves a crucial societal role in the western part of the country. Nakanbé is the native name for the White Volta, the second largest river in the nation with its source located in the Sahel region.

== Planetary system ==
In 2011, radial-velocity observations made at the W. M. Keck Observatory revealed the existence of one exoplanet around HD 30856 A. The planet, HD 30856 Ab, is thought to be a gas giant at least 1.5 times the mass of Jupiter, which orbits its host star at a distance of 1.85 AU once every 847 days (2.32 years). Its orbit is nearly circular (i.e., with a low eccentricity), similar to planets in the Solar System.

The HD 30856 planetary system
Companion (in order from star)	Mass	Semimajor axis (AU)	Orbital period (days)	Eccentricity	Inclination (°)	Radius
HD 30856 Ab (Nakanbé)	>1.547 M_{J}	1.85	847.468 ± 19.811	0.061 ± 0.058	—	1.228 R_{J}

== See also ==
- List of proper names of stars
- List of proper names of exoplanets
- List of stars in Eridanus
- List of exoplanets discovered in 2011
