= HD 1502 =

K-type subgiant star in the constellation Pisces

HD 1502 / Citadelle
- Location of HD 1502 (circled)

Observation data Epoch J2000.0 Equinox ICRS
- Constellation: Pisces
- Right ascension: 00^{h} 19^{m} 17.0660^{s}
- Declination: +14° 03′ 17.123″
- Apparent magnitude (V): 8.36

Characteristics
- Evolutionary stage: subgiant
- Spectral type: K0 IV
- B−V color index: 0.92

Astrometry
Radial velocity (R_{v})	−9.98±0.12 km/s
Proper motion (μ)	RA: +74.472 1547 mas/yr Dec.: −17.069 mas/yr
Parallax (π)	5.2018±0.0341 mas
Distance	627 ± 4 ly (192 ± 1 pc)
Absolute magnitude (M_{V})	+2.39

Details
Mass	1.46±0.15 M_{☉}
Radius	4.67±0.57 R_{☉}
Luminosity	11.75+15.14 −9.12 L_{☉}
Surface gravity (log g)	3.18 cgs
Temperature	4,947 K
Metallicity [Fe/H]	0.09±0.03 dex
Rotational velocity (v sin i)	2.70±0.5 km/s
Age	3.0+1.2 −0.8 Gyr

Other designations
- BD+13°34, HD 1502, HIP 1547, SAO 91845, TYC 601-636-1, GSC 00601-00636, 2MASS J00191704+1403172, Gaia DR2 2768172019308167296

Database references
SIMBAD	data

HD 1502 (proper name Citadelle) is an 8th-magnitude K-type subgiant star in the constellation of Pisces, located at a distance of approximately 630 light-years. A super-Jupiter planet, HD 1502 b (proper name Indépendance), is known to orbit the star.

== Nomenclature ==
In 2019, the Republic of Haiti was assigned to giving the HD 1502 system a proper name as part of the IAU100 NameExoWorlds Project, planned to celebrate the hundredth anniversary of the International Astronomical Union (IAU), which grants the right to name an exoplanetary system to every state and territory in the world. Names were submitted and selected within Haiti, which were then presented to the IAU to be officially recognized. On 17 December 2019, the IAU announced that HD 1502 and its planet, b, were named Citadelle and Indépendance, respectively.

Citadelle refers to the Citadelle Laferrière, a fortress located in Milot in northern Haiti, which was built in 1820 and declared a World Heritage Site in 1982 as part of the National History Park. Indépendance was named after the Haitian Declaration of Independence, in celebration of the country's independence on 1 January 1804.

== Stellar characteristics ==
The star has evolved past the main sequence stage and is now a subgiant with a mass of 1.46 M_{☉}, a radius of 4.67 R_{☉}, and a spectral type of K0. The star is slightly richer than the Sun in elements heavier than hydrogen and helium, with a metallicity of 0.09±0.03. (Note: This translates to an abundance of iron 10^{0.09}≈1.23 times that of the Sun. The margin of error (0.06–0.12) corresponds to a comparative abundance of 115–132% (10^{0.06}–10^{0.12}).)

The star has an effective temperature of 4,947 K (4,674 °C; 8,445 °F), making it cooler than the Sun (5,772 K). Despite this, its large size makes it roughly 12 times brighter. At around 3.0 billion years old, the star is about two-thirds the age of the Sun (4.6 Gyr). Due to its high mass, however, it is further evolved than the Sun, which will spend a total of 10 billion years as a main-sequence star.

== Planetary system ==
In 2011, an exoplanet orbiting HD 1502, designated HD 1502 b, was discovered using the radial-velocity method. HD 1502 b revolves around its host star at a distance of 1.262 AU (188.8 million km) with a period of little over one year in a near-circular orbit (i.e., with a low eccentricity), similarly to planets in the Solar System. It is a super-Jupiter planet with a minimum mass of 2.75 M_{J} and a predicted radius of 1.183 R_{J}.

The HD 1502 planetary system
Companion (in order from star)	Mass	Semimajor axis (AU)	Orbital period (days)	Eccentricity	Inclination (°)	Radius
b (Indépendance)	≥2.75±0.16 M_{J}	1.262±0.092	428.5±1.2	0.031±0.022	—	1.183 (predicted) R_{J}

== See also ==
- List of proper names of stars
- List of proper names of exoplanets
- List of stars in Pisces
- List of exoplanets discovered in 2011
