= WASP-80 =

Star in the constellation Aquila

WASP-80 / Petra
Observation data Epoch J2000 Equinox ICRS
- Constellation: Aquila
- Right ascension: 20^{h} 12^{m} 40.1694^{s}
- Declination: −02° 08′ 39.187″
- Apparent magnitude (V): 11.939

Characteristics
- Evolutionary stage: Main sequence
- Spectral type: K7V – M9V

Astrometry
Radial velocity (R_{v})	+9.82±0.77 km/s
Proper motion (μ)	RA: −132.913 mas/yr Dec.: −50.683 mas/yr
Parallax (π)	20.1141±0.0207 mas
Distance	162.2 ± 0.2 ly (49.72 ± 0.05 pc)

Details
Mass	0.614^{+0.014}_{−0.012} M_{☉}
Radius	0.586^{+0.017}_{−0.018} R_{☉}
Luminosity	0.093 L_{☉}
Surface gravity (log g)	4.60±0.02 cgs
Temperature	4,066±22 K
Metallicity [Fe/H]	0.13±0.11 dex
Rotation	23.5±3
Rotational velocity (v sin i)	5.04±0.19 km/s
Age	1.352±0.222 Gyr

Other designations
- Petra, TYC 5165-481-1, GSC 05165-00481, 2MASS J20124017-0208391, Gaia DR2 4223507222112425344

Database references
SIMBAD	data

WASP-80 is a K-type main-sequence star about 162 light-years away from Earth. The star's age is much younger than the Sun's at 1.352±0.222 billion years. WASP-80 could be similar to the Sun in concentration of heavy elements, although this measurement is highly uncertain.

The star was named Petra in 2019 by Jordanian amateur astronomers as part of the NameExoWorlds contest.

Three multiplicity surveys in 2015-2018 did not detect any stellar companions to WASP-80, but a survey in 2020 detected a 0.07M_{☉} companion candidate at an angular separation 2.132±0.010 arcseconds, with a false alarm probability of 3%.

== Planetary system ==
In 2013 a transiting hot Jupiter planet WASP-80 b was detected on a tight, circular orbit. The planet was named Wadirum by Jordanian astronomers in December 2019. Its equilibrium temperature is 825±19 K, while measured temperature of the dayside is 937±48 K and temperature of the nightside is 851±14 K. This temperature difference indicates a rather low planetary albedo and weak global transport of heat.

Measurement of the Rossiter–McLaughlin effect in 2015 revealed WASP-80b's is orbit is well-aligned with the equatorial plane of the star, with orbital obliquity equal to 14±14°.

Although one transmission spectrum of the planetary atmosphere showed signs of ionised potassium, another measurement in 2017 yielded a gray and featureless spectrum, probably due to a high cloud deck or haze in the atmosphere of WASP-80b. Evidence for water vapour and methane molecules (CH_{4}) were found for the planet through observations of JWST. This discovery helped uncovers the origin and evolution of the planet.

The WASP-80 planetary system
Companion (in order from star)	Mass	Semimajor axis (AU)	Orbital period (days)	Eccentricity	Inclination (°)	Radius
b (Wadirum)	0.571±0.02 M_{J}	0.0344^{+0.0011}_{−0.0010}	3.067852	0	89.02^{+0.11}_{−0.10}	1.0091^{+0.011}_{−0.0095} R_{J}
