= 8 Ursae Minoris =

Star in Ursa Minor

8 Ursae Minoris / Baekdu
Observation data Epoch J2000 Equinox ICRS
- Constellation: Ursa Minor
- Right ascension: 14^{h} 56^{m} 48.35230^{s}
- Declination: +74° 54′ 03.3212″
- Apparent magnitude (V): 6.835

Characteristics
- Evolutionary stage: Red clump
- Spectral type: G8III

Astrometry
Radial velocity (R_{v})	−9.55 km/s
Proper motion (μ)	RA: +13.139 mas/yr Dec.: +3.578 mas/yr
Parallax (π)	6.1278±0.0142 mas
Distance	532 ± 1 ly (163.2 ± 0.4 pc)
Absolute magnitude (M_{V})	+0.82

Details
Mass	1.51±0.06 M_{☉}
Radius	10.73±0.14 R_{☉}
Luminosity	52.9±5.9 L_{☉}
Surface gravity (log g)	2.53 cgs
Temperature	4,847±100 K
Metallicity [Fe/H]	−0.03±0.02 dex
Rotation	100–200 d
Age	377 Myr

Other designations
- Baekdu, HD 133086, HIP 73136, BD+75 547, 2MASS J14564834+7454032, WDS J14568+7454A, Gaia DR3 1700658653802527104

Database references
SIMBAD	data

8 Ursae Minoris is a 7th-magnitude red clump star in Ursa Minor. The star is unusually rich in lithium, with an abundance of A = 2.0±0.2 dex.

In the 2019 NameExoWorlds competition, the star was assigned to contestants in South Korea. It was named Baekdu after Paektu Mountain, the tallest mountain in North Korea.

== Planetary system ==
One exoplanet was discovered in 2015 by the Bohyunsan Optical Astronomy Observatory. It has a tight 93-day orbit at a distance of about 0.5 AU, which is unusually close for a giant host star — it should have been consumed during a previous expansion to 0.7 AU. It is officially named Halla after Hallasan, the tallest mountain in South Korea. There is also a stellar activity cycle of 65 days, and possibly a second companion orbiting at a distance of at least 5 AU.

The 8 Ursae Minoris planetary system
Companion (in order from star)	Mass	Semimajor axis (AU)	Orbital period (days)	Eccentricity	Inclination (°)	Radius
b / Halla	≥1.413+0.032 −0.033 M_{J}	0.45564+0.00020 −0.00019	93.617+0.063 −0.060	0.049+0.024 −0.025	—	—

A 2023 study suggests that 8 Ursae Minoris was initially a binary star with star masses of 1.23 and 0.86 M_{☉}. When the heavier star reached the end of the main sequence about 4.2–5.6 Gyr, it expanded until it dumped all of its mass onto the secondary and became a helium white dwarf. The other star eventually engulfed this white dwarf at around 8.6 Gyr, causing helium burning to start prematurely and forming the star that we know today. The planet may have survived the episode as a former circumbinary planet, or it may have formed from material ejected during the stellar merger. 8 Ursae Minoris is now in the red clump stage, and the planet will eventually be engulfed once it reaches the asymptotic giant branch.

Research published in May 2024 used three different methods to determine the age of 8 Ursae Minoris and came up with an estimate of 1.9–3.5 Gyr. This is much younger than the approximately 9 Gyr age required for the theory that the presence of the planet so close to 8 Ursae Minoris can be explained by a stellar merger. The researchers also estimated a new mass for the star of 1.7 solar masses, making it more compact. This would allow for the planet to orbit slightly further from the star, making its existence less of a mystery.
