= HD 96063 =

Red giant

HD 96063 / Dingolay
- Location of HD 96063 (circled)

Observation data Epoch J2000.0 Equinox ICRS
- Constellation: Leo
- Right ascension: 11^{h} 04^{m} 44.45485^{s}
- Declination: −02° 30′ 47.5901″
- Apparent magnitude (V): 8.254

Characteristics
- Evolutionary stage: red giant branch
- Spectral type: K0
- B−V color index: 0.836

Astrometry
Radial velocity (R_{v})	−1.18 km/s
Proper motion (μ)	RA: 27.824 mas/yr Dec.: −17.902 mas/yr
Parallax (π)	7.1787±0.028 mas
Distance	454 ± 2 ly (139.3 ± 0.5 pc)
Absolute magnitude (M_{V})	+2.26

Details
Mass	1.37 M_{☉}
Radius	4.75, 3.33±0.45 R_{☉}
Luminosity	8.91+3.97 −2.75 L_{☉}
Surface gravity (log g)	3.33 cgs
Temperature	5,020 K
Metallicity [Fe/H]	−0.10±0.14 dex
Rotational velocity (v sin i)	1.71±0.26, 0.870±0.500 km/s
Age	2.92±0.81 Gyr

Other designations
- AG−02°638, BD−01°2476, GC 15229, HD 96063, HIP 54158, SAO 137979, PPM 178377, TYC 4924-460-1, GSC 04924-00460, 2MASS J11044445-0230475, Gaia DR2 3791263156547622784

Database references
SIMBAD	data

HD 96063 (proper name Dingolay) is a 8th-magnitude red-giant branch star located about 454 light-years (139 pc) away in the constellation of Leo. It is orbited by one confirmed exoplanet, HD 96063 b (proper name Ramajay), a gas giant slightly larger and more massive than Jupiter.

== Nomenclature ==
In 2019, the Republic of Trinidad and Tobago was assigned to giving the HD 96063 system a proper name as part of the IAU100 NameExoWorlds Project, planned to celebrate the hundredth anniversary of the International Astronomical Union (IAU), which grants the right to name an exoplanetary system to every state and territory in the world. Names were submitted and selected within Trinidad and Tobago, which were then presented to the IAU to be officially recognized. On 17 December 2019, the IAU announced that HD 96063 and its planet, b, were named Dingolay and Ramajay, respectively.

The two names are both derived from terms related to the Trinidad and Tobago Carnival. Dingolay is a dance form that represents the culture and language of Trinidad and Tobago's ancestors via intricate movements. Ramajay is a steelpan style of singing and music that celebrates Trinidad and Tobago's forefathers' culture and language.

== Stellar characteristics ==
HD 96063 is an evolved yellow/orange star with an effective temperature of about 5,000 K, typical of stars entering the red-giant branch. Its precise nature, however, has been controversial. Once classified as a G6-type main-sequence star, the star is more recently thought to be a K-type "yellow giant," somewhere between three and five times as large as the Sun. When the planet HD 96063 b was discovered, the star was assumed to be 9.0±3.0 billion years old with a sun-like mass (1.020±0.072 M_{☉}), but subsequent studies consider it to be more massive at about 1.4 M_{☉}, and thus younger (2.92±0.81 Gyr). With a luminosity roughly ten times that of the Sun and a distance of 454 light-years, the star has an apparent magnitude of 8.254, too faint to be seen from Earth by the naked eye.

== Planetary system ==
In 2011, radial-velocity observations made at the W. M. Keck Observatory revealed the existence of an exoplanet around HD 96063. The planet, HD 96063 b, is thought to be a gas giant at least 1.265 times the mass of Jupiter, which orbits its host star at a distance of 1.11 AU with an Earth-like period of 362 days. Its orbit is moderately eccentric, with an eccentricity comparable to that of planet Mercury (0.2056).

The HD 96063 planetary system
Companion (in order from star)	Mass	Semimajor axis (AU)	Orbital period (days)	Eccentricity	Inclination (°)	Radius
b (Ramajay)	≥ 1.265 M_{J}	1.11	362.518±2.162	0.168±0.107	—	1.242 R_{J}

== See also ==
- List of proper names of stars
- List of proper names of exoplanets
- List of stars in Leo
- List of exoplanets discovered in 2011
