= HAT-P-29 =

Star in the constellation Perseus

HAT-P-29 / Muspelheim
Observation data Epoch J2000 Equinox ICRS
- Constellation: Perseus
- Right ascension: 02^{h} 12^{m} 31.47875^{s}
- Declination: +51° 46′ 43.5637″
- Apparent magnitude (V): 11.83

Characteristics
- Evolutionary stage: main-sequence
- Spectral type: F8

Astrometry
Radial velocity (R_{v})	−21.91±0.69 km/s
Proper motion (μ)	RA: −9.972 mas/yr Dec.: +1.790 mas/yr
Parallax (π)	3.1358±0.0201 mas
Distance	1,040 ± 7 ly (319 ± 2 pc)
Absolute magnitude (M_{V})	+4.11

Details
Mass	1.198^{+0.065}_{−0.063} M_{☉}
Radius	1.229^{+0.080}_{−0.073} R_{☉}
Luminosity	1.89^{+0.3}_{−0.25} L_{☉}
Surface gravity (log g)	4.337^{+0.045}_{−0.045} cgs
Temperature	6,112±88 K
Metallicity [Fe/H]	0.128^{+0.079}_{−0.080} dex
Age	2.2±1.0 Gyr

Other designations
- Muspelheim, TYC 3293-1539-1, GSC 03293-01539, 2MASS J02123147+5146435

Database references
SIMBAD	data
Exoplanet Archive	data

HAT-P-29, also known as Muspelheim since 2019 (as part of the IAU's NameExoWorlds project), is a star about 1,040 light-years (320 parsecs) away. It is an F-type main-sequence star. The star's age of 2.2±1.0 billion years is less than half that of the Sun. HAT-P-29 is slightly enriched in heavy elements, having 35% more iron than the Sun.

A very faint 19th-magnitude stellar companion was detected in 2016 at a projected separation of 3.290±0.002″, but Gaia DR2 astrometry suggests that this is an unrelated background object.

== Planetary system ==
In 2011 a transiting hot Jupiter planet, HAT-P-29b, was detected on a mildly eccentric orbit. The planet was named "Surt" by Denmark in 2019. The planetary orbit is likely aligned with the equatorial plane of the star, with a misalignment equal to 26±16 degrees.

The HAT-P-29 planetary system
Companion (in order from star)	Mass	Semimajor axis (AU)	Orbital period (days)	Eccentricity	Inclination (°)	Radius
b (Surt)	0.767^{+0.046}_{−0.045} M_{J}	0.0665±0.0012	5.723376±0.000021	0.073^{+0.029}_{−0.028}	88.06^{+0.78}_{−0.59}	1.055^{+0.079}_{−0.072} R_{J}
