= HD 131496 =

Star in the constellation Boötes

HD 131496 / Arcalís
Observation data Epoch J2000 Equinox ICRS
- Constellation: Boötes
- Right ascension: 14^{h} 53^{m} 23.028^{s}
- Declination: +18° 14′ 07.47″
- Apparent magnitude (V): 7.96

Characteristics
- Evolutionary stage: subgiant
- Spectral type: K0
- B−V color index: 1.039±0.013

Astrometry
Radial velocity (R_{v})	1.36±0.16 km/s
Proper motion (μ)	RA: 43.739 mas/yr Dec.: −33.865 mas/yr
Parallax (π)	7.547±0.0246 mas
Distance	432 ± 1 ly (132.5 ± 0.4 pc)
Absolute magnitude (M_{V})	2.8

Details
Mass	1.61±0.11 M_{☉}
Radius	4.3±0.1 R_{☉}
Luminosity	9.8±0.5 L_{☉}
Surface gravity (log g)	3.3±0.06 cgs
Temperature	4,927±44 K
Metallicity [Fe/H]	0.25±0.03 dex
Rotational velocity (v sin i)	0.48±0.5 km/s
Age	2.7±0.5 Gyr

Other designations
- Arcalís, BD+18°2957, HD 131496, HIP 72845, SAO 101274

Database references
SIMBAD	data

HD 131496, officially named Arcalís, is an evolved subgiant star with an orbiting exoplanet in the constellation Boötes. With an apparent visual magnitude of 7.9 it is too faint to be visible to the naked eye. It is located at a distance of 432 light-years based on parallax measurements, and is drifting further away with a heliocentric radial velocity of 1.4 km/s. At an age of around three billion years, this star has 1.6 times the mass of the Sun and has expanded to 4.3 times the Sun's radius. It is radiating around ten times the luminosity of the Sun from its photosphere at an effective temperature of 4,927 K.

Stars like HD 131496 are sometimes referred to as "retired A-stars", since they would have been A-type stars while on the main sequence. This name is most commonly used in connection with the search for extrasolar planets, where they are useful because these evolved stars are cooler and have more spectral lines than their main sequence counterparts, making planet detection easier.

HD 131496 and its planet, HD 131496b, were chosen as part of the 2019 NameExoWorlds campaign organised by the International Astronomical Union, which assigned each country a star and planet to be named. HD 131496 was assigned to Andorra. The winning proposal for the name of the star was Arcalís, after a mountain peak in northern Andorra where the Sun shines through a gap twice a year at fixed dates, leading to its use as a primitive Solar calendar. The planet was named Madriu, after a glacial valley and river in southeastern Andorra that forms the major part of the Madriu-Perafita-Claror UNESCO World Heritage Site.

== Planetary system ==
An exoplanet was discovered in 2011. It has a mass at least 2.2 times that of Jupiter and is orbiting at a distance of 2.09 astronomical units (AU) once every 883 days.

The HD 131496 planetary system
Companion (in order from star)	Mass	Semimajor axis (AU)	Orbital period (days)	Eccentricity	Inclination (°)	Radius
b (Madriu)	≥2.2±0.2 M_{J}	2.09±0.07	883±29	0.163±0.073	—	—
