= HD 38801 b =

Jovian size planet orbiting HD 38801

Discovery
- Discovered by: Harakawa et al.
- Discovery site: Subaru Telescope and Keck Observatory
- Discovery date: 2010
- Detection method: Doppler spectroscopy

Orbital characteristics
- Semi-major axis: 1.66±0.11 AU
- Eccentricity: 0.059±0.026
- Orbital period (sidereal): 686.8±1.4 d
- Time of perihelion: 2453849±27 JD
- Argument of perihelion: 296±14 º
- Semi-amplitude: 196.3±3.8 m/s
- Star: HD 38801

Physical characteristics
- Mass: ≥10.13±23 M_{J}

HD 38801 b is an extrasolar gas giant planet located in the constellation of Orion whose discovery was announced in 2009 and was made using the radial velocity method. The object, with a mass roughly 12 times that of Jupiter, is located 324 light years (99.4 parsecs) from Earth orbiting 1.65 astronomical units from its G-type star, HD 38801. HD 38801 b, besides being the only planet in its system also lies within the inner habitable zone and takes around 1.9 years, or 693.5 days to complete a full orbit.

HD 38801 b is characterized by its uniquely low eccentricity values, or having a near circular orbit. As a super massive planet with an orbital period of hundreds of days, this occurrence is quite uncommon.

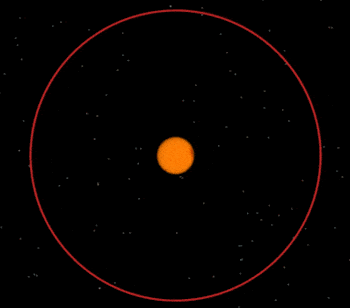
A low eccentricity orbit.
