= HD 63765 =

Star in the constellation Carina

HD 63765 / Tapecue
Observation data Epoch J2000.0 Equinox ICRS
- Constellation: Carina
- Right ascension: 07^{h} 47^{m} 49.720^{s}
- Declination: −54° 15′ 50.92″
- Apparent magnitude (V): 8.10

Characteristics
- Evolutionary stage: main sequence
- Spectral type: G9V
- Apparent magnitude (B): 8.845
- Apparent magnitude (J): 6.768±0.024
- Apparent magnitude (H): 6.442±0.027
- Apparent magnitude (K): 6.316±0.021
- B−V color index: 0.745±0.012

Astrometry
Radial velocity (R_{v})	22.36±0.12 km/s
Proper motion (μ)	RA: 148.628 mas/yr Dec.: −278.753 mas/yr
Parallax (π)	30.7532±0.0176 mas
Distance	106.06 ± 0.06 ly (32.52 ± 0.02 pc)
Absolute magnitude (M_{V})	5.49

Details
Mass	0.85±0.03 M_{☉}
Radius	0.84±0.02 R_{☉}
Luminosity	0.58±0.01 L_{☉}
Surface gravity (log g)	4.51±0.04 cgs
Temperature	5,483±421 K
Metallicity [Fe/H]	−0.16 dex
Rotation	26.7±6.7 d
Age	7.2±3.6 Gyr

Other designations
- Tapecue, CD−53°2007, HD 63765, HIP 38041, SAO 235521, PPM 336398, LTT 2952, NLTT 18486

Database references
SIMBAD	data
Exoplanet Archive	data

HD 63765 is a star with an orbiting exoplanet in the southern constellation of Carina. It is too faint to be visible with the naked eye, having an apparent visual magnitude of 8.10. The distance to this system is 106 light-years based on parallax measurements, and it is drifting further away with a heliocentric radial velocity of 22 km/s.

The star HD 63765 has the proper name Tapecue. The name was selected by Bolivia during the 100th anniversary of the IAU as part of the IAU's NameExoWorlds project. Tapecue (modern Tapekue), literally 'eternal path' in Guarani, is the Milky Way through which the first inhabitants of the Earth arrived and could return. The planet HD 63765 b is named Yvaga. Yvága means 'sky' or 'heaven' in Guarani and the Milky Way was known as the road to yvága.

This is an ordinary G-type main-sequence star with a stellar classification of G9V. It has 84% of the radius of the Sun and 85% of the Sun's mass. The star is roughly seven billion years old and is spinning with a rotation period of around 27 days. It is considered to have a moderate level of magnetic activity in its chromosphere. HD 63765 has lower iron abundance with approximately 69% of the Sun's iron-to-hydrogen ratio. It is radiating 58% of the luminosity of the Sun from its photosphere at an effective temperature of 5,483 K.

== Planetary system ==
Yvaga is an extrasolar planet which orbits the star, first observed in 2006. This presumably gas giant planet has at least 0.64 times the mass of Jupiter and takes 358 days to orbit the star at a semimajor axis of 0.94 AU. The planet was announced in a press release dating from October 2009.

The HD 63765 planetary system
Companion (in order from star)	Mass	Semimajor axis (AU)	Orbital period (days)	Eccentricity	Inclination (°)	Radius
b	≥0.64±0.05 M_{J}	0.940±0.016	358.0±1.0	0.240±0.043	—	—

== See also ==
- List of extrasolar planets
