= HIP 12961 =

Star in the constellation Eridanus

HIP 12961 / Koeia
Observation data Epoch J2000.0 Equinox ICRS
- Constellation: Eridanus
- Right ascension: 02^{h} 46^{m} 42.8869^{s}
- Declination: −23° 05′ 11.802″
- Apparent magnitude (V): 10.24

Characteristics
- Evolutionary stage: main sequence
- Spectral type: K5V or M0
- Apparent magnitude (B): 11.20
- Apparent magnitude (J): 7.56
- Apparent magnitude (H): 6.93
- Apparent magnitude (K): 6.74
- B−V color index: 1.6

Astrometry
Radial velocity (R_{v})	+32.865±0.001 km/s
Proper motion (μ)	RA: 294.717(11) mas/yr Dec.: 140.966(15) mas/yr
Parallax (π)	42.6929±0.0141 mas
Distance	76.40 ± 0.03 ly (23.423 ± 0.008 pc)
Absolute magnitude (M_{V})	8.50±0.09

Details
Mass	0.64 M_{☉} 0.65±0.07 M_{☉}
Radius	0.63 R_{☉} 0.61±0.04 R_{☉}
Luminosity	0.095±0.018 L_{☉}
Surface gravity (log g)	4.65±0.09 cgs
Temperature	3,901±175 K 4,092±93 K
Metallicity [Fe/H]	+0.10±0.06 dex −0.14 dex0.01±0.17 dex
Rotational velocity (v sin i)	1.5 km/s

Other designations
- Koeia, CD−23 1056, HIP 12961, SAO 168043, PPM 245393, LTT 1349, NLTT 8966, TYC 6434-00494-1, 2MASS J02464286-2305119

Database references
SIMBAD	data
Exoplanet Archive	data

HIP 12961 is a star with an exoplanetary companion in the equatorial constellation of Eridanus. It is too faint to be visible to the naked eye, with an apparent visual magnitude of 10.24. The distance to this system can be estimated from its parallax measurements, which yield a separation of 76.4 light-years from the Sun. It is receding with a radial velocity of +33 km/s and has a high proper motion, traversing the celestial sphere at an angular rate of 0.300″ yr^{−1}.

This was classified as a cool red dwarf star of stellar classification M0 in 1980, while C. B. Stephenson graded it as class K5V in 1986. The absolute magnitude and color index of this star is a closer match to the former. It shows a high chromospheric activity level and is one of the largest and brightest M class red dwarf stars known, with 64% of the mass and 63% of the radius of the Sun. The star is radiating 10% of the luminosity of the Sun from its photosphere at an effective temperature of 4,092 K.

HIP 12961 is named Koeia. The name was selected in the NameExoWorlds campaign by Puerto Rico, during the 100th anniversary of the IAU. Koeia was the word for star in the language of the Taíno Indigenous People of the Caribbean.

== Planetary system ==
HIP 12961 b is an extrasolar planet that was announced in a press release in October 2009. This planet has at least half the mass of Jupiter and takes over eight weeks to orbit the host star at a separation of 0.25 AU and an eccentricity (ovalness) of 0.17. The planet is named Aumatex. Aumatex was the god of wind in the mythology of the Taíno Indigenous People of the Caribbean. The names were chosen by the Society of Women in Space Exploration- UPR-Humacao Chapter.

The HIP 12961 planetary system
Companion (in order from star)	Mass	Semimajor axis (AU)	Orbital period (days)	Eccentricity	Inclination (°)	Radius
b / Aumatex	≥0.35 M_{J}	0.25	57.435 ± 0.042	0.166 ± 0.034	—	—
