= HD 98219 =

Star in the constellation Crater

HD 98219 / Hunahpú
Observation data Epoch J2000.0 Equinox ICRS
- Constellation: Crater
- Right ascension: 11^{h} 17^{m} 47.55306^{s}
- Declination: –23° 58′ 31.4969″
- Apparent magnitude (V): +8.05

Characteristics
- Spectral type: K0III/IV

Astrometry
Radial velocity (R_{v})	−10.52±0.12 km/s
Proper motion (μ)	RA: −130.715 mas/yr Dec.: −16.761 mas/yr
Parallax (π)	8.8365±0.0234 mas
Distance	369.1 ± 1.0 ly (113.2 ± 0.3 pc)
Absolute magnitude (M_{V})	+2.6

Details
Mass	1.41 M_{☉}
Radius	4.6 R_{☉}
Luminosity	8.284 L_{☉}
Surface gravity (log g)	3.36 cgs
Temperature	4,925 K
Age	4 Gyr

Other designations
- Hunahpú, CD−23 9857, HD 98219, HIP 55174, SAO 179747

Database references
SIMBAD	data
Exoplanet Archive	data

HD 98219, also named Hunahpú, is a subgiant star in the constellation Crater. It has a confirmed exoplanet. At around 4 billion years old, it is a star around 1.3 times as massive as the Sun that has cooled and expanded to 4.5 times the Sun's diameter, brightening to be around 11 times as luminous. The International Astronomical Union (IAU) gave the opportunity to Honduras to name the star Hunahpú as part of NameExoWorlds. Hunahpú was one of the twin gods who became the Sun in K'iche' (Quiché) Mayan mythology.

== Planetary system ==
A gas giant planet with a minimum mass almost double that of Jupiter was discovered as part of a radial velocity survey of subgiant stars at Keck Observatory. The International Astronomical Union (IAU) has named it Ixbalanqué, the twin brother of Hunahpú.

The HD 98219 planetary system
Companion (in order from star)	Mass	Semimajor axis (AU)	Orbital period (days)	Eccentricity	Inclination (°)	Radius
b / Ixbalanqué	≥1.964±0.099 M_{J}	1.26±0.12	433.8±2.0	0.079±0.040	—	—
