= HD 168746 =

Star in the constellation Serpens

HD 168746 / Alasia
Observation data Epoch J2000 Equinox ICRS
- Constellation: Serpens
- Right ascension: 18^{h} 21^{m} 49.783^{s}
- Declination: −11° 55′ 21.65″
- Apparent magnitude (V): 7.95

Characteristics
- Evolutionary stage: subgiant
- Spectral type: G5V
- B−V color index: 0.713

Astrometry
Radial velocity (R_{v})	25.606±0.0003 km/s
Proper motion (μ)	RA: −22.963 mas/yr Dec.: −68.395 mas/yr
Parallax (π)	23.9884±0.0259 mas
Distance	136.0 ± 0.1 ly (41.69 ± 0.05 pc)
Absolute magnitude (M_{V})	4.78

Details
Mass	0.90±0.01 M_{☉}
Radius	1.07±0.01 R_{☉}
Luminosity	1.04±0.01 L_{☉}
Surface gravity (log g)	4.32±0.01 cgs
Temperature	5,637±26 K
Metallicity [Fe/H]	−0.06±0.05 dex
Rotation	8.7 d
Rotational velocity (v sin i)	1.0 km/s
Age	12.0±0.9 Gyr; 10.25^{+0.68}_{−0.88} Gyr

Other designations
- Alasia, BD−11°4606, HD 168746, HIP 90004, SAO 161386, PPM 234431

Database references
SIMBAD	data
Exoplanet Archive	data

HD 168746 is a Sun-like star with a close orbiting exoplanet in the constellation of Serpens. With an apparent visual magnitude of 7.95, it is too faint to be viewed with the naked eye but is easily visible with binoculars or a small telescope. The distance to this system is 136 light years based on parallax measurements, and it is drifting further away from the Sun with a radial velocity of 25.6 km/s.

This is an old G-type main-sequence star with a stellar classification of G5V. The level of magnetic activity in the chromosphere is negligible. It has just 90% of the mass of the Sun but a 7% larger radius. The star is radiating a 4% greater luminosity than the Sun from its photosphere at an effective temperature of 5,637 K.

In 2019 the HD 168746 planetary system was chosen as part of the NameExoWorlds campaign organised by the International Astronomical Union to mark to 100th anniversary of the organisation. Each country was assigned a star and planet to be named with HD 168746 being assigned to Cyprus. The winning proposal named the star Alasia, an ancient name for Cyprus, and the planet Onasilos after an ancient Cypriot physician identified in the Idalion Tablet, one of the oldest known legal contracts.

== Planetary system ==
In 2006, the exoplanet HD 168746 b was discovered by Exoplanet group at the Geneva Observatory with the radial velocity method using the CORALIE spectrograph on the Swiss 1.2-metre Leonhard Euler Telescope. At the time it was one of the lowest minimum mass planets that had been discovered.

The HD 168746 planetary system
Companion (in order from star)	Mass	Semimajor axis (AU)	Orbital period (days)	Eccentricity	Inclination (°)	Radius
b (Onasilos)	>0.23 M_{J}	0.065	6.403 ± 0.001	0.081 ± 0.029	—	—

== See also ==
- HD 168443
- HD 169830
- List of extrasolar planets
