= HD 99706 =

Star in the constellation Ursa Major

Observation data Epoch J2000 Equinox ICRS
- Constellation: Ursa Major
- Right ascension: 11^{h} 28^{m} 30.2137^{s}
- Declination: +43° 57′ 59.685″
- Apparent magnitude (V): 7.65

Characteristics
- Evolutionary stage: Subgiant
- Spectral type: K0
- B−V color index: 1.0

Astrometry
Radial velocity (R_{v})	−30.07 km/s
Proper motion (μ)	RA: 45.406 mas/yr Dec.: −87.500 mas/yr
Parallax (π)	6.7929±0.0518 mas
Distance	480 ± 4 ly (147 ± 1 pc)
Absolute magnitude (M_{V})	2.12

Details
Mass	1.46 M_{☉}
Radius	5.52 R_{☉}
Luminosity	13.1±0.1 L_{☉}
Surface gravity (log g)	3.09 cgs
Temperature	4,862 K
Metallicity [Fe/H]	0.05 dex
Rotational velocity (v sin i)	1.8±0.6 km/s
Age	2.8±0.2 Gyr

Other designations
- BD+44°2096, HD 99706, HIP 55994, TYC 3015-1137-1, 2MASS J11283020+4357597

Database references
SIMBAD	data

HD 99706 is an orange-hued star in the northern circumpolar constellation of Ursa Major. With an apparent visual magnitude of 7.65, it is too dim to be visible to the naked eye but can be viewed with a pair of binoculars. Parallax measurements provide a distance estimate of approximately 480 light years from the Sun, and the Doppler shift shows it is drifting closer with a radial velocity of −30 km/s. It has an absolute magnitude of 2.12, indicating it would be visible to the naked eye as a 2nd magnitude star if it were located 10 parsecs away.

This is an aging subgiant star belonging to spectral class K0, having exhausted the supply of hydrogen at its core and begun to evolve into a giant. Its age is younger than the Sun's at 2.8±0.2 billion years and it is spinning slowly with a projected rotational velocity of 2 km/s. The star has 1.5 times the mass of the Sun and has expanded to 5.5 times the Sun's radius. It is slightly enriched in heavy elements, having 110% of solar abundance. HD 99706 is radiating 13 times the luminosity of the Sun from its photosphere at an effective temperature of 4,862 K.

An imaging survey at Calar Alto Observatory in 2016 failed to detect any stellar companions to HD 99706.

== Planetary system ==
In 2011 one superjovian exoplanet, HD 99706 b, on a mildly eccentric orbit around star HD 99706 was discovered utilizing the radial velocity method. Another superjovian exoplanet on an outer orbit was detected in 2016.

The HD 99706 planetary system
Companion (in order from star)	Mass	Semimajor axis (AU)	Orbital period (days)	Eccentricity	Inclination (°)	Radius
HD 99706 b	>1.23 M_{J}	1.98	841	0.25	—	1.244 R_{J}
HD 99706 c	>5.69+1.43 −0.96 M_{J}	—	1278+151 −198	0.411+0.231 −0.178	—	—
