= HD 7199 =

Star in the constellation Tucana

HD 7199 / Emiw
Observation data Epoch J2000.0 Equinox ICRS
- Constellation: Tucana
- Right ascension: 01^{h} 10^{m} 47.22102^{s}
- Declination: −66° 11′ 17.3883″
- Apparent magnitude (V): +8.06

Characteristics
- Evolutionary stage: main sequence
- Spectral type: K1IV
- B−V color index: 0.849±0.012

Astrometry
| Radial velocity (R_{v}) | +5.63±0.15 km/s |
| Proper motion (μ) | RA: +110.671 mas/yr Dec.: −123.406 mas/yr |
| Parallax (π) | 27.6929±0.0161 mas |
| Distance | 117.78 ± 0.07 ly (36.11 ± 0.02 pc) |
| Absolute magnitude (M_{V}) | 5.32 |

Details
| Mass | 0.93±0.02 M_{☉} |
| Radius | 0.98±0.02 R_{☉} |
| Luminosity | 0.70±0.01 L_{☉} |
| Surface gravity (log g) | 4.42±0.03 cgs |
| Temperature | 5,349±38 K |
| Metallicity [Fe/H] | +0.39±0.106 dex |
| Rotation | 42.89±4.66 d |
| Rotational velocity (v sin i) | 2.209±0.327 km/s |
| Age | 9.5±2.4 Gyr |

Other designations
- Emiw, CD−66°60, HD 7199, HIP 5529, SAO 248334, 2MASS J01104719-6611171

Database references
| SIMBAD | data |
| Exoplanet Archive | data |

HD 7199 is a star in the constellation Tucana located 118 light years distance from the Sun based on parallax. It has an orange hue but is too dim to be viewed with the naked eye, having an apparent visual magnitude of +8.06. The star is drifting further away from the Sun with a radial velocity of +5.6 km/s.

The star HD 7199 is named Emiw. The name was selected in the NameExoWorlds campaign by Mozambique, during the 100th anniversary of the IAU. Emiw represents love in the local Makhuwa language.

This object has a stellar classification of K1IV, matching a K-type subgiant star that is in the process of cooling and expanding off the main sequence, having exhausted the supply of hydrogen at its core. It is around 10 billion years old with a low projected rotational velocity of 2.2 km/s. The star looks to be very metal-rich, having more than double the abundance of iron compared to the Sun. Both mass and radius are lower than the Sun's, and it only radiates 70% of the Sun's luminosity. It displays a Sun-like magnetic activity cycle.

== Planetary system ==
The High Accuracy Radial Velocity Planet Searcher (HARPS) in Chile found it to have a planet with a minimum of 0.29 times the mass of Jupiter – 92 times the mass of Earth – with an orbital period of 615 days.

The planet HD 7199 b was named Hairu in 2019. Hairu represents unity in the Makhuwa language.

The HD 7199 planetary system
| Companion (in order from star) | Mass | Semimajor axis (AU) | Orbital period (days) | Eccentricity | Inclination (°) | Radius |
|---|---|---|---|---|---|---|
| HD 7199 b (Hairu) | >0.29±0.023 M_{J} | 1.36±0.02 | 615±7 | 0.36±0.12 | — | — |
