= HD 109246 =

G-type main-sequence star with one exoplanet

Observation data Epoch J2000 Equinox ICRS
- Constellation: Draco
- Right ascension: 12^{h} 32^{m} 07.18754^{s}
- Declination: +74° 29′ 22.3681″
- Apparent magnitude (V): 8.75

Characteristics
- Evolutionary stage: main sequence
- Spectral type: G0V
- B−V color index: 0.645

Astrometry
Radial velocity (R_{v})	−19.31±0.18 km/s
Proper motion (μ)	RA: −171.665 mas/yr Dec.: −48.488 mas/yr
Parallax (π)	14.7174±0.0148 mas
Distance	221.6 ± 0.2 ly (67.95 ± 0.07 pc)
Absolute magnitude (M_{V})	4.66

Details
Mass	1.01±0.11 M_{☉}
Radius	1.02±0.07 R_{☉}
Surface gravity (log g)	4.46±0.19 cgs
Temperature	5844±21 K
Metallicity [Fe/H]	0.10±0.05 dex
Rotational velocity (v sin i)	3±1 km/s

Other designations
- Funi, BD+75 474, GC 17098, HD 109246, HIP 61177, SAO 7585, NLTT 31050

Database references
SIMBAD	data
Exoplanet Archive	data

HD 109246, also named Funi, is a G-type main-sequence star in the constellation Draco. It is located 222 light-years from the Sun. The star hosts one known exoplanet, which was discovered in 2010.

== Nomenclature ==
The designation HD 109246 comes from the Henry Draper Catalogue.

This was one of the systems selected to be named in the 2019 NameExoWorlds campaign during the 100th anniversary of the IAU, which assigned each country a star and planet to be named. This system was assigned to Iceland. The approved names were Funi for the star, an old Icelandic word meaning fire or blaze, and Fold for the planet, meaning earth or soil.

== Planetary system ==
HD 109246 b (later named Fold) is a gas giant exoplanet. The discovery came from using the radial velocity method with SOPHIE spectrograph at the Haute-Provence Observatory. HD 109246 b holds a minimum mass of 0.77 Jupiter masses. It orbits every 68.27 days at a semi-major axis of 0.33 AU. The eccentricity is 0.12.

The HD 109246 planetary system
Companion (in order from star)	Mass	Semimajor axis (AU)	Orbital period (days)	Eccentricity	Inclination (°)	Radius
b / Fold	≥0.77±0.09 M_{J}	0.33±0.08	68.27±0.13	0.12±0.04	—	—
