= HD 63454 =

Star in the constellation Chamaeleon

HD 63454 / Ceibo
Observation data Epoch J2000.0 Equinox ICRS
- Constellation: Chamaeleon
- Right ascension: 07^{h} 39^{m} 21.85290^{s}
- Declination: −78° 16′ 44.3078″
- Apparent magnitude (V): 9.36±0.02

Characteristics
- Spectral type: K3 V(k)
- U−B color index: +0.98
- B−V color index: +1.06

Astrometry
Radial velocity (R_{v})	+33.61±0.15 km/s
Proper motion (μ)	RA: −19.556 mas/yr Dec.: −39.926 mas/yr
Parallax (π)	26.5541±0.0114 mas
Distance	122.83 ± 0.05 ly (37.66 ± 0.02 pc)
Absolute magnitude (M_{V})	+6.68

Details
Mass	0.80 M_{☉}
Radius	0.80±0.04 R_{☉}
Luminosity	0.287±0.005 L_{☉}
Surface gravity (log g)	4.52±0.16 cgs
Temperature	4,840±66 K
Metallicity [Fe/H]	0.00±0.06 dex
Rotation	8.28 days
Rotational velocity (v sin i)	2.6 km/s
Age	1.0 Gyr

Other designations
- Ceibo, CD−77°298, CPD−77°324, HD 63454, HIP 37284, TYC 9385-1045-1

Database references
SIMBAD	data
Exoplanet Archive	data

HD 63454, formally named Ceibo, is a star located in the southern circumpolar constellation Chamaeleon near the border with Mensa. To see the star, one needs a small telescope because it has an apparent magnitude of 9.36, which is below the limit for naked eye visibility. The object is located relatively close at a distance of 123 light-years based on Gaia DR3 parallax measurements but is receding with a heliocentric radial velocity of 33.8 km/s. At its current distance, HD 63454's brightness is diminished by two tenths of a magnitude due to interstellar dust. It has an absolute magnitude of +6.68.

== Properties ==
HD 63454 has a stellar classification of K3 V(k), indicating that it is a K-type main-sequence star with some infilling of the calcium K and H lines. It has 80% the mass of the Sun and 80% the Sun's radius. It radiates 28.7% the luminosity of the Sun from its photosphere at an effective temperature of 4,840 K, giving it an orange hue. HD 63454 has a solar metallicity and is estimated to be about one billion years old, a third the age of the Sun. It spins modestly with a projected rotational velocity of 2.6 km/s.

== Planetary system ==
On Valentine’s Day 2005, a hot Jupiter HD 63454 b was found by Claire Moutou, Michel Mayor, and François Bouchy using the radial velocity method.

After the 2019 IAU100 NameExoWorlds campaign, the International Astronomical Union, approved the names proposed from Uruguay: Ceibo for the star and Ibirapitá for the planet, respectively after the native Uruguayan tree species Erythrina crista-galli and Peltophorum dubium.

These names were announced on 17 December 2019, at a press conference of the IAU in Paris, together with other 111 sets of exoplanets and host stars. Ceibo and Ibirapitá were proposed by Adrián Basedas, from the Astronomical Observatory of Liceo Nº9, Montevideo, Uruguay, who won the national contest "Nombra Tu Exoplaneta", organized in Uruguay, to name HD 63454 and HD 63454 b.

Evidence for an outer body from astrometry was presented in 2026. Its mass is somewhere between three and 60 M_{J}, making it either a planet or brown dwarf.

The HD 63454 planetary system
Companion (in order from star)	Mass	Semimajor axis (AU)	Orbital period (days)	Eccentricity	Inclination (°)	Radius
HD 63454 b (Ibirapitá)	≥0.25±0.01 M_{J}	0.036	2.818049±0.000071	0.0	—	~1.10 R_{J}
c (unconfirmed)	9.2+52.6 −5.8 M_{J}	20.7+41.4 −14.6	—	—	—	—

== See also ==
- List of extrasolar planets
