= HD 217786 =

Binary star system in the constellation Pisces

Observation data Epoch J2000 Equinox J2000
- Constellation: Pisces
- Right ascension: 23^{h} 03^{m} 08.20704^{s}
- Declination: −00° 25′ 46.6777″
- Apparent magnitude (V): 7.78

Characteristics
- Spectral type: F8V
- B−V color index: 0.578±0.004

Astrometry
Radial velocity (R_{v})	+10.00±0.02 km/s
Proper motion (μ)	RA: −89.933 mas/yr Dec.: −168.781 mas/yr
Parallax (π)	17.9946±0.0793 mas
Distance	181.3 ± 0.8 ly (55.6 ± 0.2 pc)
Absolute magnitude (M_{V})	4.09 + 11.02±0.13

Details

A
Mass	1.02 M_{☉}
Radius	1.32±0.06 R_{☉}
Luminosity	1.93±0.04 L_{☉}
Surface gravity (log g)	4.13±0.02 cgs
Temperature	5,882±8 K
Metallicity	−0.19±0.01
Rotational velocity (v sin i)	1.18±0.05 km/s
Age	9.40±0.22 Gyr

HD 217786 B
Mass	0.1622+0.0071 −0.0068 M_{☉}

Other designations
- BD−01°4382, HD 217786, HIP 113834, TYC 5242-591-1, GSC 05242-00591, 2MASS J23030822-0025465, Gaia DR2 2650902026099857920

Database references
SIMBAD	data

HD 217786 is a binary star system in the equatorial constellation of Pisces. With an apparent visual magnitude of 7.78, it requires binoculars or a small telescope to view. The system is located at a distance of 181 light-years from the Sun based on parallax, and is drifting further away with a radial velocity of +10 km/s. Kinematically, the star system belongs to the thin disk population of the Milky Way.

The primary is an F-type main-sequence star with a stellar classification of F8V. It is much older than Sun with an estimated age of 9.4 billion years and is spinning slowly with a projected rotational velocity of 1.2 km/s. The star has a lower proportion of heavy elements than the Sun, having 65% of solar abundance. It has about the same mass as the Sun but a 32% larger radius. The star is radiating nearly double the luminosity of the Sun from its photosphere at an effective temperature of 5,882 K.

A low-mass stellar companion at a projected separation of 155 AU was discovered in 2016. The proper motion of this co-moving object suggests it is gravitationally-bound to the primary, and their orbit is being viewed edge-on. If the orbit is assumed to be circular, then the orbital period for the pair is ~6.2 Myr. No other companion stars have been detected at separations from 2.74 to 76.80 AUs.

The star system exhibits strong stellar flare activity in the ultraviolet.

== Planetary system ==
In 2010 one superjovian planet or brown dwarf on an eccentric orbit was discovered utilising the radial velocity method. Designated component Ab, the high eccentricity of this object may have been caused by interaction with the secondary star. In 2022, the inclination and true mass of HD 217786 Ab were measured via astrometry, and a second planet was discovered orbiting closer to the star.

The HD 217786 A planetary system
Companion (in order from star)	Mass	Semimajor axis (AU)	Orbital period (days)	Eccentricity	Inclination (°)	Radius
c	≥0.023±0.002 M_{J}	0.038±0.002	2.5+0.00010 −0.00005	—	—	—
b	13.852+1.267 −1.311 M_{J}	2.446+0.109 −0.119	1,301.4+1.2 −0.5	0.311+0.002 −0.003	69.767+0.601 −0.386	—
