= HD 70573 =

Star in the constellation Hydra

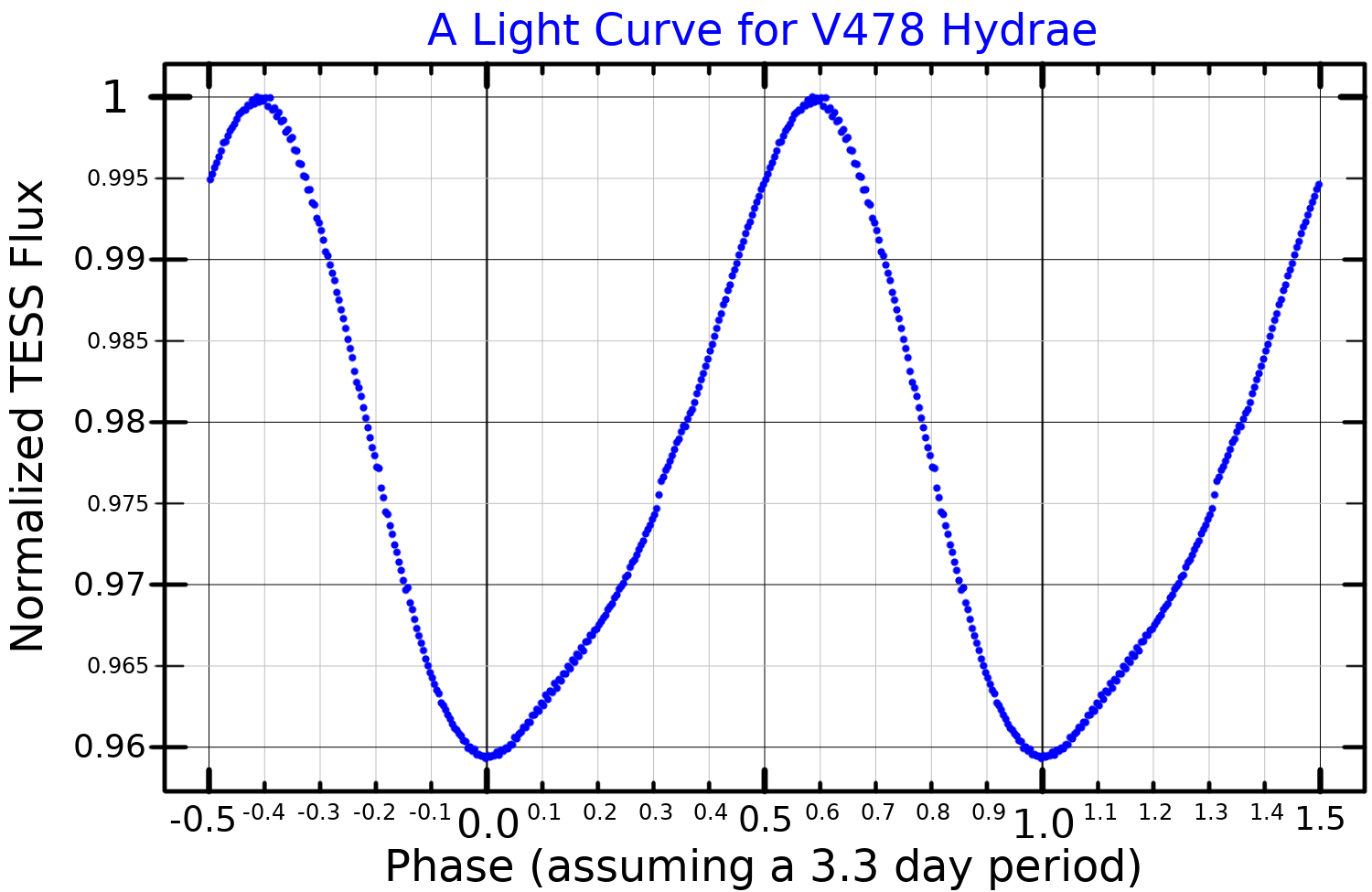
- A light curve for V478 Hydrae, plotted from TESS data

Observation data Epoch J2000.0 Equinox ICRS
- Constellation: Hydra
- Right ascension: 08^{h} 22^{m} 49.95277^{s}
- Declination: +01° 51′ 33.5522″
- Apparent magnitude (V): 8.66-8.77

Characteristics
- Evolutionary stage: main sequence
- Spectral type: G1/2V
- B−V color index: 0.59
- Variable type: BY Dra

Astrometry
Radial velocity (R_{v})	20.16±0.22 km/s
Proper motion (μ)	RA: −51.362±0.017 mas/yr Dec.: −49.047±0.013 mas/yr
Parallax (π)	16.9267±0.0168 mas
Distance	192.7 ± 0.2 ly (59.08 ± 0.06 pc)
Absolute magnitude (M_{V})	+0.4

Details
Mass	1.0±0.1 M_{☉}
Radius	0.98+0.01 −0.03 R_{☉}
Luminosity	0.998±0.004 L_{☉}
Surface gravity (log g)	4.59±0.10 cgs
Temperature	5,837+80 −51 K
Metallicity [Fe/H]	−0.18±0.20 dex
Rotation	3.296 days
Rotational velocity (v sin i)	14.7±1.0 km/s
Age	2.3±2.1 Gyr

Other designations
- V478 Hya, BD+02°1951, HD 70573, SAO 116694

Database references
SIMBAD	data

HD 70573 is a variable star in the equatorial constellation of Hydra. At a mean apparent visual magnitude of +8.7, this yellow-hued star is too dim to be visible to the naked eye. Based upon parallax measurements, it is located at a distance of 193 light years from the Sun, and is drifting further away with a radial velocity of 20.5 km/s. It is a candidate member of the proposed Hercules-Lyra Association of co-moving stars, although this membership is disputed.

This is a G-type main-sequence star with a stellar classification of G1/2V. It is a BY Draconis variable that ranges in brightness from magnitude 8.66 down to 8.77 with a rotationally-modulated period of 3.296 days. HD 70573 is generally considered to be a young star although estimates of its age vary from 60 million years to several billion years. It has a projected rotational velocity of 15 km/s and about the same mass, size, and luminosity as the Sun.

== Planetary system ==
On March 19, 2007, an extrasolar planet was announced, having been discovered by the radial velocity method. As of 2007, this was the youngest host star discovered to have an orbiting planet. However, a follow-up study by Soto et al. in 2015 failed to detect the planetary signal, so it remains unconfirmed.

The system displays an infrared excess, which matches the black body signature of a debris disk orbiting 21.8 AU from the host star with a mean temperature of 60 K.

The HD 70573 planetary system
Companion (in order from star)	Mass	Semimajor axis (AU)	Orbital period (days)	Eccentricity	Inclination (°)	Radius
b (unconfirmed)	≥6.1±0.4 M_{J}	1.76±0.05	851.8±11.6	0.4±0.1	—	—
