= HD 145457 =

Star in the constellation Corona Borealis

HD 145457 / Kamuy
Observation data Epoch J2000.0 Equinox ICRS
- Constellation: Corona Borealis
- Right ascension: 16^{h} 10^{m} 03.91440^{s}
- Declination: +26° 44′ 33.8932″
- Apparent magnitude (V): 6.57

Characteristics
- Evolutionary stage: red clump
- Spectral type: K0 III
- B−V color index: +1.037±0.005

Astrometry
Radial velocity (R_{v})	−3.25±0.12 km/s
Proper motion (μ)	RA: −18.354 mas/yr Dec.: +36.856 mas/yr
Parallax (π)	7.3867±0.0153 mas
Distance	441.5 ± 0.9 ly (135.4 ± 0.3 pc)
Absolute magnitude (M_{V})	1.09

Details
Mass	1.57±0.46 M_{☉}
Radius	10.49+0.13 −0.41 R_{☉}
Luminosity	49.97±0.27 L_{☉}
Surface gravity (log g)	2.72±0.11 cgs
Temperature	4,738+95 −28 K
Metallicity [Fe/H]	−0.177 dex
Age	5.2 Gyr

Other designations
- Kamuy, BD+27°2595, HD 145457, HIP 79219, SAO 84223

Database references
SIMBAD	data

HD 145457 is a star located in the northern constellation of Corona Borealis (The Northern Crown) at a distance of around 442 light-years from the Sun, as determined through parallax measurements. It has been formally named Kamuy by the IAU, after a spiritual or divine being in Ainu mythology. With an apparent magnitude of 6.57, it is barely visible to the unaided eye on dark nights clear of light pollution. It is drifting closer to the Sun with a radial velocity of −3.2 km/s.

HD 145457 is an aging giant star with a stellar classification of K0 III that has cooled and expanded off the main sequence after exhausting its core hydrogen supply. With the assumption that it is a helium-burning object, the properties of HD 145457 can be derived by comparison with evolutionary tracks. With an age of 5.2 billion years old, it is around 1.57 times as massive as the Sun and has swollen to around 10 times its diameter. It is radiating 50 times the luminosity of the Sun from its enlarged photosphere at an effective temperature of 4,738 K.

It is a lithium-rich giant, unusual since lithium is rapidly destroyed once a star becomes a red giant. One explanation for the excess lithium in these stars has been a recent engulfment of a planet, but it is now thought more likely to be due to nucleosynthesis in the star. It is generally assumed that these lithium-rich giants are members of the red clump, core helium burning stars at the cool end of the horizontal branch.

== Planetary system ==
HD 145457 has an exoplanetary companion called HD 145457 b discovered in 2010. 2.9 times as massive as Jupiter, it orbits about every 176 days with an orbital eccentricity of 0.112±3.1. Its semimajor axis is 0.76 AU. HD 145457 b was discovered by precise Doppler measurements with the Subaru Telescope.

As part of the IAU NameExoWorlds project in 2019, HD 145457 b has been formally named Chura. The name was selected by Japan. Chura is a word in the Ryukyuan/Okinawan language meaning natural beauty.

The HD 145457 planetary system
Companion (in order from star)	Mass	Semimajor axis (AU)	Orbital period (days)	Eccentricity	Inclination (°)	Radius
b	≥2.794+0.132 −0.117 M_{J}	0.762±0.001	176.13+0.18 −0.20	0.111+0.039 −0.040	—	—
