= L 168-9 =

Star in the constellation Tucana

L 168-9 / Danfeng
Observation data Epoch J2000 Equinox ICRS
- Constellation: Tucana
- Right ascension: 23^{h} 20^{m} 07.52452^{s}
- Declination: −60° 03′ 54.6447″
- Apparent magnitude (V): 11.02±0.06

Characteristics
- Evolutionary stage: Main sequence
- Spectral type: M1V
- Apparent magnitude (B): 12.45±0.19
- Apparent magnitude (V): 11.02±0.06
- Apparent magnitude (G): 10.237±0.003
- Apparent magnitude (J): 7.941±0.019
- Apparent magnitude (H): 7.320±0.053
- Apparent magnitude (K): 7.082±0.031

Astrometry
Radial velocity (R_{v})	29.44±0.21 km/s
Proper motion (μ)	RA: −319.924 mas/yr Dec.: −127.782 mas/yr
Parallax (π)	39.7113±0.0244 mas
Distance	82.13 ± 0.05 ly (25.18 ± 0.02 pc)

Details
Mass	0.614±0.055 M_{☉}
Radius	0.604±0.037 R_{☉}
Luminosity (bolometric)	0.0723±0.0018 L_{☉}
Surface gravity (log g)	4.84±0.08 cgs
Temperature	3842±32 K
Metallicity [Fe/H]	0.06±0.13 dex
Rotation	29±2 d
Age	3.0 Gyr

Other designations
- Danfeng, CD−60 8051, GJ 4332, HIP 115211, L 168-9, LTT 9494, NLTT 56509, PM J23201-6003, TOI-134, TIC 234994474, TYC 9126-748-1, 2MASS J23200751-6003545, WISEA J232007.06-600355.8

Database references
SIMBAD	data
Exoplanet Archive	data
ARICNS	data

L 168-9 (also known as GJ 4332 or TOI-134, officially named Danfeng) is a red dwarf star located 82.1 light-years (25.2 parsecs) away from the Solar System in the constellation of Tucana. The star has about 61% the mass and 60% the radius of the Sun. It has a temperature of 3,842 K (3,569 °C; 6,456 °F) and a rotation period of 29 days. L 168-9 is orbited by one known exoplanet.

== Nomenclature ==
The designation L 168-9 comes from Luyten's first catalogue of stars with high proper motion.

In August 2022, this planetary system was included among 20 systems to be named by the third NameExoWorlds project. The approved names, proposed by a team from China, were announced in June 2023. L 168-9 is named Danfeng (丹凤) and its planet is named Qingluan (青鸾), after mythological birds of ancient China.

== Planetary system ==
The exoplanet L 168-9 b, officially named Qingluan, was discovered in 2020 using TESS. At the discovery, this terrestrial super-Earth was thought to have about 4.6 times the mass and 1.39 times the radius of Earth, and an estimated equilibrium temperature of 965 K (692 °C; 1,277 °F). L 168-9 b is a target for observation and atmospheric characterization with the James Webb Space Telescope, and has been observed as one of its first targets.

A newer study refined the planetary parameters of L 168-9 b. The newer research found a lower mass of 4.07 M_{🜨} and a higher radius of 1.63 R_{🜨}. These parameters imply a lower density of 5.18 g/cm^{3}, in contrast to the previous value of 9.6 g/cm^{3}. Given the lower density of the planet, it more likely has a pure rock composition, rather than a 50% iron core and 50% silicate mantle as previously proposed. The orbital parameters show little variation, while the equilibrium temperature was updated to 998±39 K.

Transmission spectra of combined near- and mid-infrared observations by the James Webb Space Telescope showed no atmospheric features. However, further observations are required to rule out a thick (100 bar) carbon dioxide atmosphere, which could also explain the data.

The L 168-9 planetary system
Companion (in order from star)	Mass	Semimajor axis (AU)	Orbital period (days)	Eccentricity	Inclination (°)	Radius
b / Qingluan	4.07±0.45 M_{🜨}	0.0208±0.0006	1.40153±0	<0.21	84.27±1.01	1.63±0.14 R_{🜨}
