= HD 79498 =

Star in the constellation Cancer

Observation data Epoch J2000.0 Equinox ICRS
- Constellation: Cancer
- Right ascension: 09^{h} 15^{m} 09.4020^{s}
- Declination: +23° 22′ 31.979″
- Apparent magnitude (V): 8.05

Characteristics
- Evolutionary stage: main sequence
- Spectral type: G5 V + M0 V
- Variable type: None

Astrometry
Radial velocity (R_{v})	19.94±0.14 km/s
Proper motion (μ)	RA: −127.013 mas/yr Dec.: −155.703 mas/yr
Parallax (π)	20.5658±0.0198 mas
Distance	158.6 ± 0.2 ly (48.62 ± 0.05 pc)
Absolute magnitude (M_{V})	4.62

Details

Primary (A)
Mass	1.08 M_{☉}
Radius	1.05 R_{☉}
Luminosity	1.07 L_{☉}
Surface gravity (log g)	4.43 cgs
Temperature	5,800 K
Metallicity [Fe/H]	+0.21 dex
Rotational velocity (v sin i)	2.0 km/s
Age	2.8 Gyr

Secondary (B)
Temperature	3,881 K
Metallicity [Fe/H]	0.18 dex

Other designations
- BD+23°2063, HD 79498, HIP 45406, SAO 80717, 2MASS J09150941+2322323

Database references
SIMBAD	data

HD 79498 is a double star in the northern constellation of Cancer. The primary component of this pair has an orbiting exoplanet companion. This star is too faint to be viewed with the naked eye, having an apparent visual magnitude of 8.05. The system is located at a distance of 159 light years based on parallax measurements, and is drifting further away with a heliocentric radial velocity of 20 km/s. It has a relatively high proper motion, traversing the celestial sphere at an angular rate of 0.2″·yr^{−1}.

The primary, designated component A, is a G-type main-sequence star with a stellar classification of G5 V. It has 8% greater mass compared to the Sun and a 5% larger girth. The star is estimated to be 2.8 billion years old and appears to be spinning slowly with a projected rotational velocity of 2.0 km/s. It has a higher than solar abundance of elements other than hydrogen and helium; what astronomers term a metal-rich star. The star is radiating 7% more luminosity than the Sun from its photosphere at an effective temperature of 5,800 K. There appears to be only a low level of magnetic activity in the star's chromosphere.

The secondary member, component B, is located at a projected separation of 2,900 AU from the primary. It is a small red dwarf of spectral class M0 V.

== Planetary system ==
The McDonald Observatory planet search program discovered an exoplanet orbiting the primary in 2011 using the radial velocity method.

The HD 79498 planetary system
Companion (in order from star)	Mass	Semimajor axis (AU)	Orbital period (days)	Eccentricity	Inclination (°)	Radius
Ab	≥1.34±0.07 M_{J}	3.13±0.08	1,966±41	0.59±0.02	—	—

== See also ==
- List of stars in Cancer
