= HD 192263 b =

Gas giant extrasolar planet in the constellation Aquila

HD 192263 b / Beirut
Discovery
- Discovered by: Santos, Mayor, Naef et al.
- Discovery site: La Silla Observatory
- Discovery date: September 28th, 1999
- Detection method: Doppler Spectroscopy (CORALIE)

Orbital characteristics
- Semi-major axis: 0.15 AU (22,000,000 km)
- Eccentricity: 0
- Orbital period (sidereal): 24.348 ± 0.005 d
- Time of periastron: 2,451,979.28 ± 0.08
- Argument of periastron: 0
- Semi-amplitude: 51.9 ± 2.6
- Star: HD 192263

HD 192263 b, also named Beirut, is a gas giant planet with a mass about three quarters that of Jupiter mass. It orbits the star in a circular orbit completing one revolution in 24 days or so. It was discovered in 2000 by the Geneva Extrasolar Planet Search team. The planet was independently detected by the California and Carnegie Planet Search team.

== Naming ==
The planet HD 192263 b is named Beirut. The name was selected in the NameExoWorlds campaign by Lebanon, during the 100th anniversary of the IAU. Beirut is the capital and largest city of Lebanon.

== Discovery ==
In 2002 the existence of the planet was questioned by G. Henry: The star was observed to have photometric brightness variations that have same period and velocities as the planet. The signal could come from those variations instead of the planet orbiting the star or suggests that rotational modulation of the visibility of stellar surface activity is the source of the observed radial velocity variations. Finally, in 2003 the planet was confirmed; the planet is thought to be causing fluctuations in the system's magnetic field, causing visible activity.

== Characteristics ==
Preliminary astrometry in 2001 set its inclination at 179.5°; but it is now thought to be inclined according to the star's ecliptic, edge-on to Earth.

== See also ==
- List of exoplanets discovered before 2000
