= HD 148427 =

Star in the constellation Ophiuchus

Observation data Epoch J2000.0 Equinox J2000.0
- Constellation: Ophiuchus
- Right ascension: 16^{h} 28^{m} 28.1512^{s}
- Declination: −13° 23′ 58.690″
- Apparent magnitude (V): 6.89

Characteristics
- Spectral type: K0III/IV
- Apparent magnitude (B): 7.840
- Apparent magnitude (J): 5.299
- Apparent magnitude (H): 4.875
- Apparent magnitude (K): 4.682
- B−V color index: 0.950

Astrometry
Radial velocity (R_{v})	−34.76±0.12 km/s
Proper motion (μ)	RA: −37.413 mas/yr Dec.: +3.049 mas/yr
Parallax (π)	14.2059±0.0206 mas
Distance	229.6 ± 0.3 ly (70.4 ± 0.1 pc)
Absolute magnitude (M_{V})	3.04

Details
Mass	1.45±0.06 M_{☉}
Radius	3.22±0.2 R_{☉}
Luminosity	6.09±0.75 L_{☉}
Surface gravity (log g)	3.59±0.10 cgs
Temperature	5052±44 K
Metallicity [Fe/H]	+0.154±0.04 dex
Rotation	55.7 days
Rotational velocity (v sin i)	2.13±0.5 km/s
Age	2.5 Gyr

Other designations
- Timir, BD−13°4437, HD 148427, HIP 80687, SAO 159932, PPM 231736

Database references
SIMBAD	data
Exoplanet Archive	data

HD 148427, formally named Timir, is a 7th-magnitude star approximately 230 light-years away in the constellation Ophiuchus. It has a spectral type of K0III/IV, indicating a K-type star that is close to becoming a red giant. While some sources describe it as a subgiant, stellar evolution models suggest it is already on the red giant branch. Its mass is 45% greater than the Sun, and it is three times the size and six times more luminous, although its age is 2.5 billion years, younger than the Sun.

== Companion ==
In August 2009, it was found to have a companion in orbit (HD 148427 b or Tondra) with a minimum mass of 0.96 M_{J}, suggesting it is a gas giant planet, and an orbital period of 331.5 days. An astrometric study in 2020 suggested that this object has a nearly face-on orbit, with a true mass between 27 and 345 M_{J}. This would make it either a brown dwarf or a low-mass red dwarf star, rather than a planet. However, a 2026 study instead found an edge-on orbit, indicating a planetary mass. While this study's measurements are uncertain, they suggest the companion is likely substellar.

The HD 148427 planetary system
Companion (in order from star)	Mass	Semimajor axis (AU)	Orbital period (days)	Eccentricity	Inclination (°)	Radius
b / Tondra	1.2+0.2 −0.3 M_{J}	1.11±0.06	331.9+1.9 −2.2	0.12+0.09 −0.08	90.2+30.5 −30.7	—

== Naming ==
HD 148427 and HD 148427 b were chosen as part of the 2019 NameExoWorlds campaign organised by the International Astronomical Union, which assigned each country a star and planet to be named. HD 148427 was assigned to Bangladesh. The winning name for the star was Timir meaning darkness in the Bengali language, alluding to the star being far away in the darkness of space. The winning name for the companion was Tondra meaning nap in the Bengali language, alluding to the symbolic notion that the object was asleep until discovered.

== See also ==
- List of extrasolar planets
