= HD 102956 b =

Extrasolar planet in the constellation Ursa Major

HD 102956 b / Isagel

Discovery
- Discovered by: Johnson et al.
- Discovery site: Keck Observatory
- Discovery date: 2010
- Detection method: Doppler spectroscopy

Orbital characteristics
- Semi-major axis: 0.0807±0.0073 AU
- Eccentricity: 0.037±0.019
- Orbital period (sidereal): 6.49470±0.00019 d
- Time of perihelion: 2,455,351.45±0.64 JD
- Argument of perihelion: 301±33 º
- Semi-amplitude: 74.6±1.8 m/s
- Star: HD 102956

Physical characteristics
- Mass: ≥0.960±0.023 M_{J}

HD 102956 b or Isagel is an extrasolar planet discovered in 2010 by a team of American astronomers led by John Johnson using Doppler spectroscopy and the Keck Observatory in Hawaii. HD 102956 b is in the orbit of host star HD 102956. The planet is at least the mass of Jupiter, orbiting every 6.5 days at a distance of 12 million km. HD 202956 b has a very circular orbit. The system is roughly 399 light-years from the Sun.

== Discovery and nomenclature ==
The name HD 102956 derives directly from the fact that the star is the 102,956th star catalogued in the Henry Draper Catalogue. The designation of b is given to the first planet orbiting a given star.

The star is one of the 2.5 million brightest stars in the sky and is part of the Tycho-2 Catalogue. It is not visible to the naked eye with an apparent magnitude of 8.

=== NameExoWorlds ===
In 2019 this planet was announced as part of the IAU NameExoWorlds project where it was designated as the planet that will be named by Sweden. The winning proposal was Isagel, from Nobel laureate Harry Martinson's space poem Aniara.

== Host star ==
HD 102956 (Aniara) is an orange subgiant with a mass and radius of 1.68 M_{☉} and 4.4 R_{☉}, respectively. The surface temperature is about 5,054 K (4,781 °C). The star is 11.6 times brighter than the Sun. The star's age is estimated at 2.3 billion years.
