= HD 18742 =

Star in the constellation Eridanus

HD 18742 / Ayeyarwady
- Location of HD 18742 (circled)

Observation data Epoch J2000.0 Equinox ICRS
- Constellation: Eridanus
- Right ascension: 03^{h} 00^{m} 10.65643^{s}
- Declination: −20° 48′ 09.3773″
- Apparent magnitude (V): 7.81

Characteristics
- Evolutionary stage: red giant branch
- Spectral type: G8/K0IV
- B−V color index: 0.93
- J−H color index: 0.472
- J−K color index: 0.623

Astrometry
Radial velocity (R_{v})	−13.7 km/s
Proper motion (μ)	RA: -19.599 mas/yr Dec.: −22.666 mas/yr
Parallax (π)	6.1858±0.0248 mas
Distance	527 ± 2 ly (161.7 ± 0.6 pc)
Absolute magnitude (M_{V})	+2.19

Details
Mass	1.36, 1.73±0.19 M_{☉}
Radius	5.13 R_{☉}
Luminosity	13.18+5.44 −3.85, 20.66±0.46 L_{☉}
Surface gravity (log g)	3.09 cgs
Temperature	4940 K
Metallicity [Fe/H]	−0.14 dex
Rotational velocity (v sin i)	1.72±0.23, 2.98±0.50 km/s
Age	2.49±0.58 Gyr

Other designations
- BD−21°533, CPD−21°295, HD 18742, HIP 13993, SAO 168212, PPM 245676, TIC 71345433, TYC 5870-602-1, GSC 05870-00602, 2MASS J03001065-2048091, Gaia DR1 5079636964618154112, Gaia DR2 5079636934554540160

Database references
SIMBAD	data

HD 18742 (proper name Ayeyarwady) is an 8th-magnitude subgiant star located about 530 light-years (160 pc) away in the constellation of Eridanus. It is orbited by one confirmed exoplanet, super-Jupiter HD 18742 b (proper name Bagan), and possibly by another Jovian planetary candidate (HD 18742 c).

== Stellar characteristics ==
HD 18742 is a yellow subgiant star with a spectral type of G8/K0 IV. Its physical parameters vary from publication to publication, with calculated radii ranging between 4.08–6.34 R_{☉}, and mass estimates falling mostly between 1.36–1.73 M_{☉}, though a 2017 paper suggests a significantly higher value of 2.58±0.24 M_{☉}. The star has an effective temperature of about 5,000 K (4,730 °C; 8,540 °F) and a luminosity of 13.2 or 20.7 L_{☉}, and is thought to be about 2.3–2.5 billion years old. Seen from Earth, the star has an apparent magnitude of 7.81, making it visible with binoculars and by the naked eye under the darkest skies with effort.

== Nomenclature ==
In 2019, the Republic of the Union of Myanmar was assigned to giving the HD 18742 system a proper name as part of the IAU100 NameExoWorlds Project, planned to celebrate the hundredth anniversary of the International Astronomical Union (IAU), which grants the right to name an exoplanetary system to every state and territory in the world. Names were submitted and selected within Myanmar, which were then presented to the IAU to be officially recognized. On 17 December 2019, the IAU announced that HD 18742 and its confirmed planet, b, were named Ayeyarwady and Bagan, respectively.

Ayeyarwady was named after a river of the same name, the longest and most important river in Myanmar. Bagan refers to one of the ancient cities of the country located right beside the Ayeyarwady, which was listed as a UNESCO World Heritage Site in 2019.

== Planetary system ==
In 2011, radial-velocity observations made at the W. M. Keck Observatory revealed the existence of one exoplanet around HD 18742. The planet, HD 18742, is thought to be a gas giant with a minimum mass of 3.362 M_{J}, which orbits its host star at a distance of 1.82 AU once every 766 days (2.10 years). Its orbit is nearly circular (i.e., with a low eccentricity), similar to planets in the Solar System.

Other than the doppler shifts caused by HD 18742 b, radial-velocity measurements used to discover the planet also included an additional linear trend. Utilizing data gathered at the Keck Observatory between 2007 and 2015, Luhn et al. subtracted the effects of HD 18742 b from the radial-velocity curve, revealing a 900-day-period signal, possibly caused by another similar planet. Though the existence of such a planet would provide a far better match to the observed curve, this signal remains a planetary candidate since it would be in a 9:10 resonance with HD 18742 b, a non-physical resonance that is previously unheard of. Follow-up observations are expected to show the true nature of the system.

The HD 18742 planetary system
Companion (in order from star)	Mass	Semimajor axis (AU)	Orbital period (days)	Eccentricity	Inclination (°)	Radius
b (Bagan)	≥3.362±1.236 M_{J}	1.82	766.419±24.763	0.040±0.035	—	1.166 R_{J}
c (unconfirmed)	≥2.426±1.226 M_{J}	1.96	858.724±40.797	0.056±0.052	—	1.194 R_{J}

== See also ==
- List of proper names of stars
- List of proper names of exoplanets
- List of stars in Eridanus
- List of exoplanets discovered in 2011
