= NameExoWorlds =

IAU exoworld naming projects

NameExoWorlds (also known as IAU NameExoWorlds) were various projects managed by the International Astronomical Union (I.A.U.) to encourage names to be submitted for astronomical objects, notably exoplanets. The accepted names would later be considered for official adoption by the organization.

== Projects ==
The first such project (NameExoWorlds I), in 2015, regarded the naming of stars and exoplanets. 573,242 votes were submitted by members by the time the contest closed on October 31, 2015, and the names of 31 exoplanets and 14 stars were selected from these. Many of the names chosen were based on world history, mythology and literature.

In June 2019, another such project (NameExoWorlds II), in celebration of the organization's hundredth anniversary, in a project officially called IAU100 NameExoWorlds, welcomed countries of the world to submit names for exoplanets and their host stars. A star with an exoplanet was assigned to each country, and members of the public submitted names for them.

The third NameExoWorlds project was announced in August 2022. It gave names to 20 exoplanets and their host stars, all of which are targets for observation by the James Webb Space Telescope. The names were announced in June 2023.

== See also ==
- Astronomical naming conventions
- IAU Working Group on Star Names
- List of proper names of exoplanets
- List of proper names of stars
- Proper names (astronomy)
- Stellar designations and names
- Stars named after people
