= Andrew Vanden Heuvel =

American astronomer and science educator

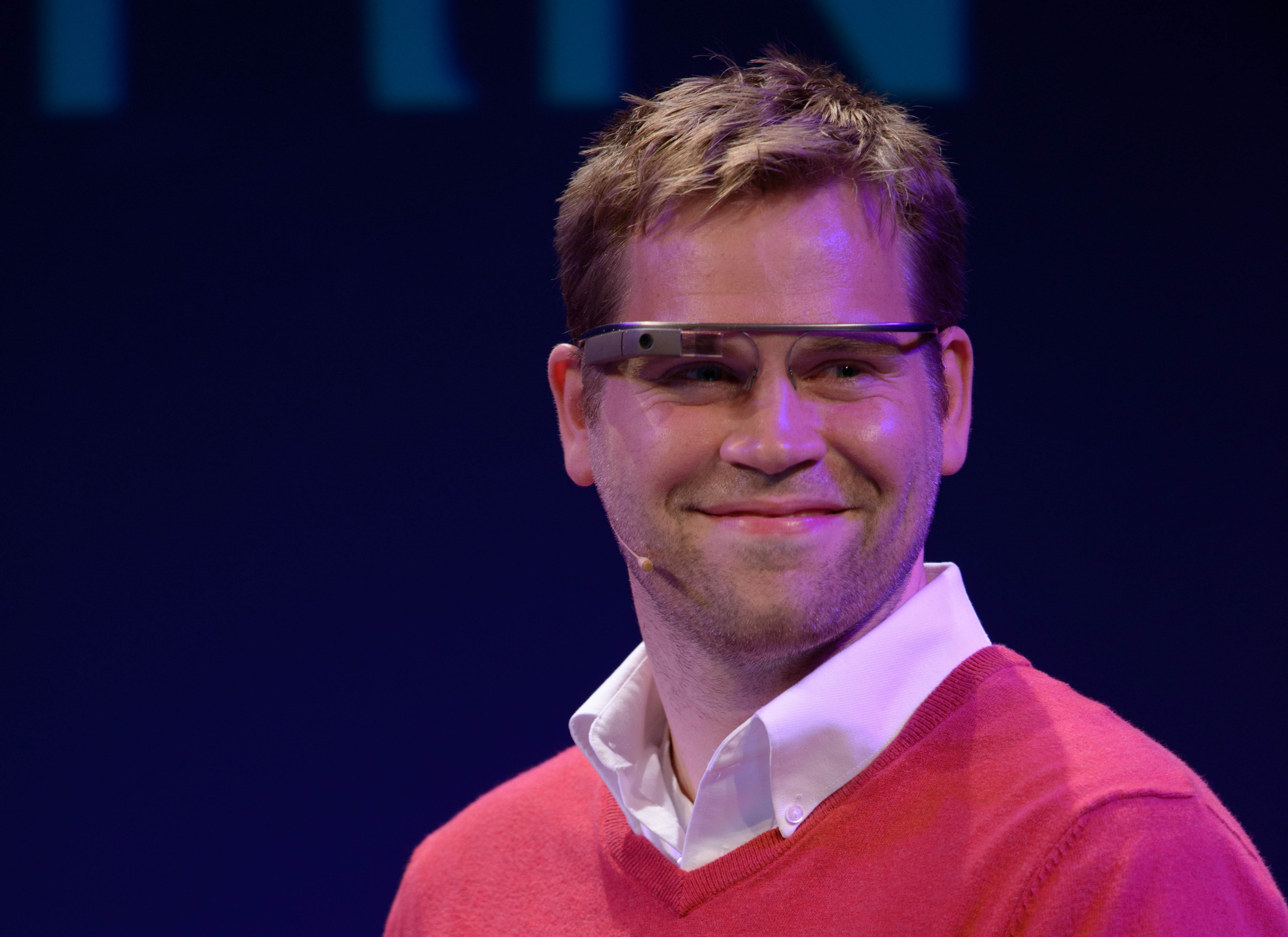
- Vanden Heuvel in 2013
- Born: Andrew David Vanden Heuvel
- Education: Calvin College (B.S.); University of Florida (M.S.)
- Occupations: Astronomer; Science educator
- Honours: Michigan Online Teacher of the Year
- Website: https://www.andrewvh.com/

Andrew Vanden Heuvel is an American astronomer and science educator. He is the co-discoverer of several celestial bodies, including asteroids 128177 Griffioen and 210425 Imogene as well as the gaseous exoplanet HD 102195 b.

In 2013, Vanden Heuvel was selected as one of the first Google Glass Explorers. He traveled to the Large Hadron Collider at CERN where he taught a live, first-person physics lesson from inside the particle accelerator.

== Background ==
Andrew Vanden Heuvel earned a Bachelor of Science (B.S.) in physics from Calvin College in 2004 and an M.S. in astrophysics from the University of Florida in 2006.

Vanden Heuvel is known for his work with educational technology, particularly his use of Google Glass to teach science and his YouTube Channel STEMbite.

== Astronomical discoveries ==
Andrew Vanden Heuvel is credited by the Minor Planet Center for the discovery of asteroid 128177 Griffioen, formerly designated 2003 RA_{11}. Vanden Heuvel discovered the asteroid on the night of September 5, 2003, while using Calvin College's 16-inch telescope to measure the rotation period of asteroid 3091 van den Heuvel. In 2006, Vanden Heuvel later named 2003 RA_{11} in honor of Roger Griffioen, a long-time dean and department chair at Calvin University.

While in graduate school at the University of Florida, Vanden Heuvel was part of the research team that discovered the hot Jupiter exoplanet HD 102195 b.

As a physics teacher at The Prairie School in Racine, WI, Vanden Heuvel discovered four more asteroids while working on a class project with his students: 210425 Imogene, 212925, 504423, and 597965.
