= ET1 =

ET1 or ET-1 may refer to

- ET1 (Greece) the first channel from Ellinikí Radiofonía Tileórasi (ERT), the Hellenic Broadcasting Corporation
- ET-1, a planet orbiting star HD 102195
- Electronics Technician 1st Class (ET1), a US Navy enlisted rating
- Endothelin 1, a peptide playing important role in vascular haemostasis
