= HD 102195 =

Star in the constellation Virgo

HD 102195 / Flegetonte
Observation data Epoch J2000 Equinox ICRS
- Constellation: Virgo
- Right ascension: 11^{h} 45^{m} 42.29287^{s}
- Declination: +02° 49′ 17.3241″
- Apparent magnitude (V): 8.07

Characteristics
- Evolutionary stage: main sequence
- Spectral type: K0 V
- B−V color index: 0.835

Astrometry
Radial velocity (R_{v})	1.88±0.13 km/s
Proper motion (μ)	RA: −188.815 mas/yr Dec.: −113.269 mas/yr
Parallax (π)	34.0634±0.0215 mas
Distance	95.75 ± 0.06 ly (29.36 ± 0.02 pc)
Absolute magnitude (M_{V})	5.76

Details
Mass	0.88±0.03 M_{☉}
Radius	0.84±0.02 R_{☉}
Luminosity	0.49±0.01 L_{☉}
Surface gravity (log g)	4.53±0.03 cgs
Temperature	5,283±29 K
Metallicity [Fe/H]	+0.09 dex
Rotation	12.3 d
Rotational velocity (v sin i)	2.6 km/s
Age	5.9±3.5 Gyr

Other designations
- BD+03°2549, HD 102195, HIP 57370, HR 4293, SAO 119033, LTT 13232, NLTT 28458

Database references
SIMBAD	data

HD 102195 is an orange-hued star in the zodiac constellation of Virgo with a confirmed exoplanet companion. With an apparent visual magnitude of 8.07, the star is too faint to be seen with the naked eye. The distance to HD 102195 can be estimated from its annual parallax shift of 34.06 mas, yielding 95.8 light years. It is moving further away from the Earth with a heliocentric radial velocity of 1.89 km/s. This is a high proper motion star and a possible member of the η Cha stellar kinematic group.

The star HD 102195 is named Flegetonte. The name was selected in the NameExoWorlds campaign by Italy, during the 100th anniversary of the IAU. Flegetonte is the underworld river of fire from Greek mythology in the Italian narrative poem on the afterlife Divina Commedia.

This K-type main-sequence star has a stellar classification of K0 V. It is a quasi-periodic variable star with a cycle of 11.5 days, a variation range of 3.65%, and a phased amplitude of 94%. HD 102195 is around six billion years old with a rotation period of 12.3 days. It has 88% of the Sun's mass and 84% of the Sun's radius. It is radiating 49% of the Sun's luminosity from its photosphere at an effective temperature of 5,283 K.

In 2005, an orbiting companion was detected using the Exoplanet Tracker instrument. This near Jupiter-mass exoplanet has an orbital period of 4.1 days with a circular orbit. By comparing the rotation period and radius of the star with the projected rotational velocity, Melo et al. (2007) derived an orbital inclination of 47°. This would suggest a planetary mass of 0.62 M_{J}.

The HD 102195 planetary system
Companion (in order from star)	Mass	Semimajor axis (AU)	Orbital period (days)	Eccentricity	Inclination (°)	Radius
b / Lete	≥0.45 M_{J}	0.0491	4.113775±0.000557	0.0 (assumed)	—	—

== See also ==
- List of extrasolar planets
