= HD 102195 b =

Hot Jupiter orbiting HD 102195

HD 102195 b / Lete
Discovery
- Discovered by: Ge et al.
- Discovery date: January 12, 2006
- Detection method: Doppler spectroscopy (Exoplanet Tracker)

Orbital characteristics
- Apastron: 0.052 AU (7,800,000 km)
- Periastron: 0.046 AU (6,900,000 km)
- Semi-major axis: 0.049 AU (7,300,000 km)
- Eccentricity: 0.06 (± 0.03)
- Orbital period (sidereal): 4.115 (± 0.001) d 0.01127 y
- Average orbital speed: 130
- Time of periastron: 2453731.7 (± 0.5)
- Argument of periastron: 109.9 (± 10)
- Semi-amplitude: 63.4 (± 2.0)
- Star: HD 102195

HD 102195 b (also called ET-1, and formally named Lete) is an extrasolar planet orbiting the star HD 102195 in the constellation of Virgo, discovered in January 2006. It is the first planet discovered by the Exoplanet Tracker project, using a dispersed fixed-delay interferometer. It was discovered at the Kitt Peak National Observatory. The planet is an example of a hot Jupiter, and is likely to be a gas giant based on its mass.

The planet HD 102195 b is named Lete. The name was selected in the NameExoWorlds campaign by Italy, during the 100th anniversary of the IAU. Lete is the oblivion river made of fog from Greek mythology in the Italian narrative poem on the afterlife Divina Commedia.
