= List of minor planets: 504001–505000 =

The following is a partial list of minor planets, running from minor-planet number 504001 through 505000, inclusive. The primary data for this and other partial lists is based on JPL's "Small-Body Orbital Elements" and data available from the Minor Planet Center. Critical list information is also provided by the MPC, unless otherwise specified from Lowell Observatory. A detailed description of the table's columns and additional sources are given on the main page including a complete list of every page in this series, and a statistical break-up on the dynamical classification of minor planets.

Also see the summary list of all named bodies in numerical and alphabetical order, and the corresponding naming citations for the number range of this particular list. New namings may only be added to this list after official publication, as the preannouncement of names is condemned by the Working Group for Small Bodies Nomenclature of the International Astronomical Union.

Near-Earth obj.	MBA (inner)	MBA (outer)	Centaur
Mars-crosser	MBA (middle)	Jupiter trojan	Trans-Neptunian obj.
Unclassified

== 504001–504100 ==
Designation			Discovery			Properties		Ref
Permanent	Provisional	Named after	Date	Site	Discoverer(s)	Category	Diam.	Ref
504001	2005 AO_{9}	—	December 18, 2004	Socorro	LINEAR	·	2.6 km	MPC · JPL
504002	2005 AM_{16}	—	December 11, 2004	Kitt Peak	Spacewatch	·	2.2 km	MPC · JPL
504003	2005 AH_{70}	—	January 15, 2005	Kitt Peak	Spacewatch	·	1.7 km	MPC · JPL
504004	2005 BS_{8}	—	January 16, 2005	Socorro	LINEAR	·	2.7 km	MPC · JPL
504005	2005 CA_{73}	—	February 1, 2005	Kitt Peak	Spacewatch	·	1.7 km	MPC · JPL
504006	2005 EP_{116}	—	March 4, 2005	Mount Lemmon	Mount Lemmon Survey	·	760 m	MPC · JPL
504007	2005 EQ_{252}	—	September 27, 2003	Socorro	LINEAR	H	580 m	MPC · JPL
504008	2005 FA_{1}	—	March 16, 2005	Catalina	CSS	H	450 m	MPC · JPL
504009	2005 FV_{4}	—	March 30, 2005	Catalina	CSS	PHO	930 m	MPC · JPL
504010	2005 GQ_{96}	—	April 6, 2005	Mount Lemmon	Mount Lemmon Survey	·	1.4 km	MPC · JPL
504011	2005 GT_{133}	—	April 10, 2005	Kitt Peak	Spacewatch	·	940 m	MPC · JPL
504012	2005 JC_{46}	—	May 9, 2005	Siding Spring	SSS	T_{j} (2.7)	2.6 km	MPC · JPL
504013	2005 JF_{80}	—	May 10, 2005	Mount Lemmon	Mount Lemmon Survey	·	1.0 km	MPC · JPL
504014	2005 JN_{92}	—	April 11, 2005	Mount Lemmon	Mount Lemmon Survey	·	1.0 km	MPC · JPL
504015	2005 JA_{125}	—	May 11, 2005	Kitt Peak	Spacewatch	·	2.9 km	MPC · JPL
504016	2005 JT_{149}	—	May 3, 2005	Kitt Peak	Spacewatch	H	520 m	MPC · JPL
504017	2005 JR_{182}	—	April 17, 2005	Kitt Peak	Spacewatch	EOS	1.6 km	MPC · JPL
504018	2005 MP_{29}	—	June 29, 2005	Kitt Peak	Spacewatch	·	1.2 km	MPC · JPL
504019	2005 MH_{30}	—	June 29, 2005	Kitt Peak	Spacewatch	·	2.8 km	MPC · JPL
504020	2005 NZ_{24}	—	July 4, 2005	Kitt Peak	Spacewatch	·	2.6 km	MPC · JPL
504021	2005 NH_{61}	—	July 5, 2005	Mount Lemmon	Mount Lemmon Survey	·	3.1 km	MPC · JPL
504022	2005 ND_{125}	—	July 9, 2005	Kitt Peak	Spacewatch	LIX	3.3 km	MPC · JPL
504023	2005 QP_{130}	—	August 28, 2005	Kitt Peak	Spacewatch	VER	2.2 km	MPC · JPL
504024	2005 QA_{181}	—	August 30, 2005	Kitt Peak	Spacewatch	·	470 m	MPC · JPL
504025	2005 RQ_{6}	—	September 8, 2005	Siding Spring	SSS	AMO	560 m	MPC · JPL
504026	2005 SU_{223}	—	September 29, 2005	Mount Lemmon	Mount Lemmon Survey	·	2.2 km	MPC · JPL
504027	2005 SV_{248}	—	September 30, 2005	Mount Lemmon	Mount Lemmon Survey	·	530 m	MPC · JPL
504028	2005 SQ_{266}	—	August 31, 2005	Kitt Peak	Spacewatch	·	2.8 km	MPC · JPL
504029	2005 TZ_{117}	—	October 7, 2005	Kitt Peak	Spacewatch	·	740 m	MPC · JPL
504030	2005 TF_{195}	—	October 1, 2005	Kitt Peak	Spacewatch	·	620 m	MPC · JPL
504031	2005 UG_{152}	—	October 26, 2005	Kitt Peak	Spacewatch	·	640 m	MPC · JPL
504032	2005 UL_{154}	—	October 26, 2005	Kitt Peak	Spacewatch	·	800 m	MPC · JPL
504033	2005 UN_{157}	—	October 29, 2005	Mount Lemmon	Mount Lemmon Survey	T_{j} (2.58) · APO	750 m	MPC · JPL
504034	2005 UJ_{159}	—	October 30, 2005	Palomar	NEAT	T_{j} (2.28) · APO · CYB · +1km · PHA	1.1 km	MPC · JPL
504035	2005 UH_{191}	—	October 27, 2005	Mount Lemmon	Mount Lemmon Survey	·	680 m	MPC · JPL
504036	2005 US_{203}	—	October 25, 2005	Mount Lemmon	Mount Lemmon Survey	·	660 m	MPC · JPL
504037	2005 UP_{221}	—	October 25, 2005	Kitt Peak	Spacewatch	·	670 m	MPC · JPL
504038	2005 UQ_{233}	—	October 25, 2005	Kitt Peak	Spacewatch	EUN	740 m	MPC · JPL
504039	2005 UW_{291}	—	October 26, 2005	Kitt Peak	Spacewatch	·	570 m	MPC · JPL
504040	2005 UW_{309}	—	October 28, 2005	Mount Lemmon	Mount Lemmon Survey	·	690 m	MPC · JPL
504041	2005 UL_{405}	—	October 29, 2005	Mount Lemmon	Mount Lemmon Survey	MAR	750 m	MPC · JPL
504042	2005 UX_{419}	—	October 25, 2005	Kitt Peak	Spacewatch	·	520 m	MPC · JPL
504043	2005 VJ_{18}	—	November 1, 2005	Kitt Peak	Spacewatch	·	630 m	MPC · JPL
504044	2005 VB_{65}	—	October 25, 2005	Kitt Peak	Spacewatch	CYB	4.0 km	MPC · JPL
504045	2005 VC_{113}	—	October 27, 2005	Mount Lemmon	Mount Lemmon Survey	·	870 m	MPC · JPL
504046	2005 VB_{127}	—	September 29, 2005	Mount Lemmon	Mount Lemmon Survey	·	2.3 km	MPC · JPL
504047	2005 WN_{8}	—	November 21, 2005	Kitt Peak	Spacewatch	·	1.5 km	MPC · JPL
504048	2005 WG_{21}	—	November 21, 2005	Kitt Peak	Spacewatch	·	830 m	MPC · JPL
504049	2005 WN_{68}	—	November 25, 2005	Mount Lemmon	Mount Lemmon Survey	·	790 m	MPC · JPL
504050	2005 WC_{96}	—	November 26, 2005	Kitt Peak	Spacewatch	·	760 m	MPC · JPL
504051	2005 WN_{134}	—	November 25, 2005	Mount Lemmon	Mount Lemmon Survey	·	820 m	MPC · JPL
504052	2005 WA_{148}	—	November 26, 2005	Kitt Peak	Spacewatch	MAR	810 m	MPC · JPL
504053	2005 XG_{32}	—	December 4, 2005	Kitt Peak	Spacewatch	EUN	860 m	MPC · JPL
504054	2005 XR_{42}	—	December 1, 2005	Kitt Peak	Spacewatch	·	730 m	MPC · JPL
504055	2005 XX_{51}	—	December 2, 2005	Kitt Peak	Spacewatch	·	740 m	MPC · JPL
504056	2005 XM_{70}	—	December 6, 2005	Kitt Peak	Spacewatch	·	1.4 km	MPC · JPL
504057	2005 XM_{115}	—	December 6, 2005	Mount Lemmon	Mount Lemmon Survey	·	1.2 km	MPC · JPL
504058	2005 YH_{19}	—	December 24, 2005	Kitt Peak	Spacewatch	·	460 m	MPC · JPL
504059	2005 YS_{31}	—	November 30, 2005	Mount Lemmon	Mount Lemmon Survey	·	940 m	MPC · JPL
504060	2005 YJ_{65}	—	December 2, 2005	Mount Lemmon	Mount Lemmon Survey	EUN	1.5 km	MPC · JPL
504061	2005 YE_{74}	—	December 24, 2005	Kitt Peak	Spacewatch	·	1.6 km	MPC · JPL
504062	2005 YQ_{87}	—	December 25, 2005	Mount Lemmon	Mount Lemmon Survey	·	960 m	MPC · JPL
504063	2005 YZ_{92}	—	December 27, 2005	Mount Lemmon	Mount Lemmon Survey	·	900 m	MPC · JPL
504064	2005 YJ_{160}	—	December 27, 2005	Kitt Peak	Spacewatch	·	1.7 km	MPC · JPL
504065	2005 YC_{166}	—	December 26, 2005	Mount Lemmon	Mount Lemmon Survey	(5)	840 m	MPC · JPL
504066	2005 YR_{173}	—	October 1, 2005	Mount Lemmon	Mount Lemmon Survey	·	1.6 km	MPC · JPL
504067	2005 YM_{176}	—	December 22, 2005	Kitt Peak	Spacewatch	KON	2.1 km	MPC · JPL
504068	2005 YD_{177}	—	December 22, 2005	Kitt Peak	Spacewatch	·	1.1 km	MPC · JPL
504069	2005 YB_{179}	—	December 25, 2005	Mount Lemmon	Mount Lemmon Survey	ADE	2.1 km	MPC · JPL
504070	2005 YS_{206}	—	December 27, 2005	Mount Lemmon	Mount Lemmon Survey	·	2.3 km	MPC · JPL
504071	2005 YU_{216}	—	December 29, 2005	Mount Lemmon	Mount Lemmon Survey	(5)	1.0 km	MPC · JPL
504072	2005 YW_{240}	—	December 29, 2005	Kitt Peak	Spacewatch	(5)	1.2 km	MPC · JPL
504073	2005 YU_{247}	—	December 6, 2005	Mount Lemmon	Mount Lemmon Survey	(5)	1.1 km	MPC · JPL
504074	2006 AD	—	January 1, 2006	Siding Spring	SSS	APO +1km	1.7 km	MPC · JPL
504075	2006 AM_{47}	—	December 26, 2005	Mount Lemmon	Mount Lemmon Survey	EUN	1.1 km	MPC · JPL
504076	2006 BE_{21}	—	January 22, 2006	Mount Lemmon	Mount Lemmon Survey	·	1.3 km	MPC · JPL
504077	2006 BB_{46}	—	January 23, 2006	Mount Lemmon	Mount Lemmon Survey	·	3.0 km	MPC · JPL
504078	2006 BE_{66}	—	January 23, 2006	Kitt Peak	Spacewatch	·	1.1 km	MPC · JPL
504079	2006 BM_{72}	—	January 23, 2006	Kitt Peak	Spacewatch	·	1.2 km	MPC · JPL
504080	2006 BT_{99}	—	December 27, 2005	Mount Lemmon	Mount Lemmon Survey	H	550 m	MPC · JPL
504081	2006 BM_{111}	—	January 25, 2006	Kitt Peak	Spacewatch	·	1.2 km	MPC · JPL
504082	2006 BG_{136}	—	January 5, 2006	Anderson Mesa	LONEOS	·	1.9 km	MPC · JPL
504083	2006 BQ_{136}	—	January 28, 2006	Mount Lemmon	Mount Lemmon Survey	(5)	1.1 km	MPC · JPL
504084	2006 BJ_{178}	—	January 27, 2006	Mount Lemmon	Mount Lemmon Survey	·	1.5 km	MPC · JPL
504085	2006 BW_{196}	—	January 30, 2006	Kitt Peak	Spacewatch	·	2.4 km	MPC · JPL
504086	2006 BY_{237}	—	January 23, 2006	Kitt Peak	Spacewatch	EUN	1.3 km	MPC · JPL
504087	2006 BU_{281}	—	January 23, 2006	Mount Lemmon	Mount Lemmon Survey	·	2.3 km	MPC · JPL
504088	2006 CT_{15}	—	February 1, 2006	Kitt Peak	Spacewatch	·	2.4 km	MPC · JPL
504089	2006 CG_{54}	—	January 20, 2006	Kitt Peak	Spacewatch	·	810 m	MPC · JPL
504090	2006 DW	—	February 20, 2006	Kitt Peak	Spacewatch	·	950 m	MPC · JPL
504091	2006 DD_{21}	—	February 7, 2006	Mount Lemmon	Mount Lemmon Survey	·	1.4 km	MPC · JPL
504092	2006 DO_{28}	—	February 20, 2006	Kitt Peak	Spacewatch	MRX	990 m	MPC · JPL
504093	2006 DP_{34}	—	February 20, 2006	Kitt Peak	Spacewatch	·	2.0 km	MPC · JPL
504094	2006 DM_{78}	—	February 6, 2006	Mount Lemmon	Mount Lemmon Survey	·	1.1 km	MPC · JPL
504095	2006 DO_{88}	—	February 24, 2006	Kitt Peak	Spacewatch	·	1.3 km	MPC · JPL
504096	2006 DT_{104}	—	February 25, 2006	Kitt Peak	Spacewatch	·	660 m	MPC · JPL
504097	2006 DT_{106}	—	February 25, 2006	Kitt Peak	Spacewatch	·	600 m	MPC · JPL
504098	2006 DN_{141}	—	February 25, 2006	Kitt Peak	Spacewatch	·	2.0 km	MPC · JPL
504099	2006 DJ_{183}	—	February 27, 2006	Kitt Peak	Spacewatch	·	2.3 km	MPC · JPL
504100	2006 DG_{196}	—	January 23, 2006	Catalina	CSS	·	1.9 km	MPC · JPL

== 504101–504200 ==
back to top

Designation			Discovery			Properties		Ref
Permanent	Provisional	Named after	Date	Site	Discoverer(s)	Category	Diam.	Ref
504101	2006 DT_{206}	—	February 25, 2006	Kitt Peak	Spacewatch	·	480 m	MPC · JPL
504102	2006 DR_{212}	—	February 25, 2006	Kitt Peak	Spacewatch	·	1.1 km	MPC · JPL
504103	2006 EZ_{40}	—	March 4, 2006	Kitt Peak	Spacewatch	·	1.7 km	MPC · JPL
504104	2006 FN_{2}	—	March 23, 2006	Kitt Peak	Spacewatch	·	1.4 km	MPC · JPL
504105	2006 FX_{36}	—	March 5, 2006	Socorro	LINEAR	·	2.3 km	MPC · JPL
504106	2006 GT_{23}	—	April 2, 2006	Kitt Peak	Spacewatch	·	1.6 km	MPC · JPL
504107	2006 HU_{36}	—	April 20, 2006	Kitt Peak	Spacewatch	BAR	950 m	MPC · JPL
504108	2006 HW_{81}	—	April 26, 2006	Kitt Peak	Spacewatch	·	550 m	MPC · JPL
504109	2006 HJ_{95}	—	April 30, 2006	Kitt Peak	Spacewatch	·	1.9 km	MPC · JPL
504110	2006 HT_{131}	—	April 26, 2006	Cerro Tololo	M. W. Buie	AGN	840 m	MPC · JPL
504111	2006 KN_{24}	—	May 19, 2006	Mount Lemmon	Mount Lemmon Survey	·	670 m	MPC · JPL
504112	2006 KA_{54}	—	May 21, 2006	Kitt Peak	Spacewatch	·	520 m	MPC · JPL
504113	2006 KV_{84}	—	May 8, 2006	Kitt Peak	Spacewatch	·	1.6 km	MPC · JPL
504114	2006 OH_{1}	—	June 20, 2006	Kitt Peak	Spacewatch	·	1.6 km	MPC · JPL
504115	2006 PF_{19}	—	July 25, 2006	Mount Lemmon	Mount Lemmon Survey	·	820 m	MPC · JPL
504116	2006 QY_{54}	—	August 19, 2006	Anderson Mesa	LONEOS	·	1.7 km	MPC · JPL
504117	2006 QM_{88}	—	August 18, 2006	Kitt Peak	Spacewatch	·	1.0 km	MPC · JPL
504118	2006 RR_{29}	—	August 19, 2006	Kitt Peak	Spacewatch	·	1.9 km	MPC · JPL
504119	2006 RF_{42}	—	September 14, 2006	Kitt Peak	Spacewatch	·	820 m	MPC · JPL
504120	2006 RQ_{43}	—	September 14, 2006	Kitt Peak	Spacewatch	EOS	1.6 km	MPC · JPL
504121	2006 RB_{44}	—	September 14, 2006	Kitt Peak	Spacewatch	·	3.0 km	MPC · JPL
504122	2006 RC_{46}	—	September 14, 2006	Kitt Peak	Spacewatch	·	2.1 km	MPC · JPL
504123	2006 RQ_{49}	—	September 14, 2006	Kitt Peak	Spacewatch	·	2.9 km	MPC · JPL
504124	2006 RQ_{53}	—	September 14, 2006	Kitt Peak	Spacewatch	·	870 m	MPC · JPL
504125	2006 RS_{75}	—	September 15, 2006	Kitt Peak	Spacewatch	MAS	410 m	MPC · JPL
504126	2006 RY_{75}	—	September 15, 2006	Kitt Peak	Spacewatch	·	2.2 km	MPC · JPL
504127	2006 RN_{79}	—	September 15, 2006	Kitt Peak	Spacewatch	·	740 m	MPC · JPL
504128	2006 RE_{84}	—	September 15, 2006	Kitt Peak	Spacewatch	EOS	1.3 km	MPC · JPL
504129	2006 RY_{85}	—	September 15, 2006	Kitt Peak	Spacewatch	NYS	920 m	MPC · JPL
504130	2006 RG_{86}	—	September 15, 2006	Kitt Peak	Spacewatch	·	1.8 km	MPC · JPL
504131	2006 RR_{89}	—	September 15, 2006	Kitt Peak	Spacewatch	·	870 m	MPC · JPL
504132	2006 RZ_{89}	—	September 15, 2006	Kitt Peak	Spacewatch	·	2.3 km	MPC · JPL
504133	2006 RA_{90}	—	September 15, 2006	Kitt Peak	Spacewatch	·	2.4 km	MPC · JPL
504134	2006 RM_{97}	—	September 15, 2006	Kitt Peak	Spacewatch	URS	3.2 km	MPC · JPL
504135	2006 RC_{105}	—	September 14, 2006	Mauna Kea	Masiero, J.	·	1.9 km	MPC · JPL
504136	2006 RU_{120}	—	September 15, 2006	Kitt Peak	Spacewatch	TIR	2.7 km	MPC · JPL
504137	2006 SG_{15}	—	September 17, 2006	Catalina	CSS	·	840 m	MPC · JPL
504138	2006 SP_{27}	—	September 16, 2006	Catalina	CSS	·	940 m	MPC · JPL
504139	2006 SD_{38}	—	September 18, 2006	Kitt Peak	Spacewatch	·	1.9 km	MPC · JPL
504140	2006 SG_{39}	—	September 18, 2006	Catalina	CSS	EMA	3.8 km	MPC · JPL
504141	2006 SH_{68}	—	September 19, 2006	Kitt Peak	Spacewatch	·	700 m	MPC · JPL
504142	2006 SO_{94}	—	September 18, 2006	Kitt Peak	Spacewatch	THM	2.3 km	MPC · JPL
504143	2006 SP_{129}	—	August 28, 2006	Catalina	CSS	NYS	820 m	MPC · JPL
504144	2006 SY_{129}	—	March 3, 2005	Kitt Peak	Spacewatch	H	510 m	MPC · JPL
504145	2006 SU_{146}	—	September 19, 2006	Kitt Peak	Spacewatch	EOS	1.5 km	MPC · JPL
504146	2006 SE_{147}	—	September 19, 2006	Kitt Peak	Spacewatch	MAS	530 m	MPC · JPL
504147	2006 SP_{157}	—	September 15, 2006	Kitt Peak	Spacewatch	·	870 m	MPC · JPL
504148	2006 ST_{161}	—	September 15, 2006	Kitt Peak	Spacewatch	·	720 m	MPC · JPL
504149	2006 SG_{181}	—	September 25, 2006	Mount Lemmon	Mount Lemmon Survey	·	1.9 km	MPC · JPL
504150	2006 SD_{184}	—	September 18, 2006	Kitt Peak	Spacewatch	NYS	780 m	MPC · JPL
504151	2006 SA_{220}	—	August 28, 2006	Kitt Peak	Spacewatch	·	2.0 km	MPC · JPL
504152	2006 SB_{234}	—	September 26, 2006	Kitt Peak	Spacewatch	·	2.2 km	MPC · JPL
504153	2006 SN_{254}	—	September 26, 2006	Mount Lemmon	Mount Lemmon Survey	·	1.6 km	MPC · JPL
504154	2006 SH_{257}	—	September 15, 2006	Kitt Peak	Spacewatch	·	2.7 km	MPC · JPL
504155	2006 SU_{257}	—	September 26, 2006	Kitt Peak	Spacewatch	EOS	1.6 km	MPC · JPL
504156	2006 SL_{268}	—	September 26, 2006	Kitt Peak	Spacewatch	·	2.5 km	MPC · JPL
504157	2006 SW_{279}	—	September 28, 2006	Kitt Peak	Spacewatch	·	2.6 km	MPC · JPL
504158	2006 ST_{290}	—	September 25, 2006	Kitt Peak	Spacewatch	·	800 m	MPC · JPL
504159	2006 SQ_{295}	—	September 17, 2006	Kitt Peak	Spacewatch	MAS	550 m	MPC · JPL
504160	2006 SV_{301}	—	September 26, 2006	Kitt Peak	Spacewatch	T_{j} (2.73) · unusual	7.0 km	MPC · JPL
504161	2006 SE_{313}	—	September 18, 2006	Kitt Peak	Spacewatch	·	810 m	MPC · JPL
504162	2006 SP_{316}	—	September 17, 2006	Kitt Peak	Spacewatch	NYS	730 m	MPC · JPL
504163	2006 SX_{316}	—	September 17, 2006	Kitt Peak	Spacewatch	MAS	620 m	MPC · JPL
504164	2006 SP_{325}	—	September 19, 2006	Kitt Peak	Spacewatch	·	2.6 km	MPC · JPL
504165	2006 SW_{334}	—	September 14, 2006	Kitt Peak	Spacewatch	H	530 m	MPC · JPL
504166	2006 SA_{355}	—	September 30, 2006	Mount Lemmon	Mount Lemmon Survey	THM	2.2 km	MPC · JPL
504167	2006 SU_{355}	—	September 30, 2006	Catalina	CSS	NYS	940 m	MPC · JPL
504168	2006 SO_{360}	—	September 30, 2006	Mount Lemmon	Mount Lemmon Survey	·	910 m	MPC · JPL
504169	2006 SQ_{365}	—	September 30, 2006	Mount Lemmon	Mount Lemmon Survey	H	510 m	MPC · JPL
504170	2006 SC_{378}	—	September 15, 2006	Kitt Peak	Spacewatch	·	1.7 km	MPC · JPL
504171	2006 SK_{379}	—	September 16, 2006	Kitt Peak	Spacewatch	THM	2.0 km	MPC · JPL
504172	2006 SX_{380}	—	September 27, 2006	Apache Point	A. C. Becker	·	2.5 km	MPC · JPL
504173	2006 SS_{388}	—	September 30, 2006	Apache Point	A. C. Becker	·	2.0 km	MPC · JPL
504174	2006 SK_{396}	—	September 17, 2006	Catalina	CSS	·	1.6 km	MPC · JPL
504175	2006 SN_{397}	—	September 25, 2006	Kitt Peak	Spacewatch	·	1.9 km	MPC · JPL
504176	2006 SD_{401}	—	September 27, 2006	Mount Lemmon	Mount Lemmon Survey	THM	2.0 km	MPC · JPL
504177	2006 SP_{402}	—	September 25, 2006	Mount Lemmon	Mount Lemmon Survey	·	920 m	MPC · JPL
504178	2006 SS_{402}	—	September 26, 2006	Mount Lemmon	Mount Lemmon Survey	·	1.8 km	MPC · JPL
504179	2006 SM_{403}	—	September 27, 2006	Mount Lemmon	Mount Lemmon Survey	·	2.0 km	MPC · JPL
504180	2006 SH_{408}	—	September 28, 2006	Catalina	CSS	·	3.5 km	MPC · JPL
504181	2006 TC	—	October 1, 2006	Siding Spring	SSS	APO	610 m	MPC · JPL
504182	2006 TM_{2}	—	October 2, 2006	Mount Lemmon	Mount Lemmon Survey	H	410 m	MPC · JPL
504183	2006 TU_{9}	—	September 17, 2006	Kitt Peak	Spacewatch	·	1.1 km	MPC · JPL
504184	2006 TW_{16}	—	September 25, 2006	Mount Lemmon	Mount Lemmon Survey	·	930 m	MPC · JPL
504185	2006 TK_{27}	—	October 12, 2006	Kitt Peak	Spacewatch	THM	2.2 km	MPC · JPL
504186	2006 TE_{29}	—	September 30, 2006	Mount Lemmon	Mount Lemmon Survey	·	2.9 km	MPC · JPL
504187	2006 TC_{33}	—	September 26, 2006	Mount Lemmon	Mount Lemmon Survey	·	3.2 km	MPC · JPL
504188	2006 TQ_{37}	—	October 12, 2006	Kitt Peak	Spacewatch	·	2.5 km	MPC · JPL
504189	2006 TW_{38}	—	October 12, 2006	Kitt Peak	Spacewatch	·	2.3 km	MPC · JPL
504190	2006 TA_{39}	—	October 12, 2006	Kitt Peak	Spacewatch	·	2.3 km	MPC · JPL
504191	2006 TY_{42}	—	October 12, 2006	Kitt Peak	Spacewatch	LIX	3.3 km	MPC · JPL
504192	2006 TL_{48}	—	September 26, 2006	Mount Lemmon	Mount Lemmon Survey	NYS	690 m	MPC · JPL
504193	2006 TM_{57}	—	October 15, 2006	Kitt Peak	Spacewatch	·	2.2 km	MPC · JPL
504194	2006 TY_{83}	—	October 13, 2006	Kitt Peak	Spacewatch	·	2.3 km	MPC · JPL
504195	2006 TN_{84}	—	October 13, 2006	Kitt Peak	Spacewatch	EOS	2.0 km	MPC · JPL
504196	2006 TH_{86}	—	October 13, 2006	Kitt Peak	Spacewatch	·	820 m	MPC · JPL
504197	2006 TH_{97}	—	September 18, 2006	Kitt Peak	Spacewatch	THM	2.0 km	MPC · JPL
504198	2006 TZ_{104}	—	September 30, 2006	Mount Lemmon	Mount Lemmon Survey	·	2.3 km	MPC · JPL
504199	2006 TM_{115}	—	October 1, 2006	Apache Point	A. C. Becker	·	3.3 km	MPC · JPL
504200	2006 TC_{120}	—	September 18, 2006	Kitt Peak	Spacewatch	EOS	1.4 km	MPC · JPL

== 504201–504300 ==
back to top

Designation			Discovery			Properties		Ref
Permanent	Provisional	Named after	Date	Site	Discoverer(s)	Category	Diam.	Ref
504201	2006 TE_{123}	—	October 13, 2006	Kitt Peak	Spacewatch	·	2.7 km	MPC · JPL
504202	2006 TB_{125}	—	October 4, 2006	Mount Lemmon	Mount Lemmon Survey	HYG	2.1 km	MPC · JPL
504203	2006 TA_{129}	—	October 3, 2006	Mount Lemmon	Mount Lemmon Survey	·	2.7 km	MPC · JPL
504204	2006 UY_{14}	—	September 30, 2006	Mount Lemmon	Mount Lemmon Survey	·	3.4 km	MPC · JPL
504205	2006 UP_{18}	—	October 16, 2006	Kitt Peak	Spacewatch	V	520 m	MPC · JPL
504206	2006 UX_{19}	—	October 3, 2006	Kitt Peak	Spacewatch	·	2.5 km	MPC · JPL
504207	2006 UV_{35}	—	September 27, 2006	Mount Lemmon	Mount Lemmon Survey	·	890 m	MPC · JPL
504208	2006 UV_{38}	—	October 12, 2006	Kitt Peak	Spacewatch	THM	1.7 km	MPC · JPL
504209	2006 UE_{39}	—	October 16, 2006	Kitt Peak	Spacewatch	H	430 m	MPC · JPL
504210	2006 UM_{39}	—	October 16, 2006	Kitt Peak	Spacewatch	NYS	770 m	MPC · JPL
504211	2006 UL_{42}	—	October 16, 2006	Kitt Peak	Spacewatch	·	2.1 km	MPC · JPL
504212	2006 UU_{46}	—	October 16, 2006	Kitt Peak	Spacewatch	·	790 m	MPC · JPL
504213	2006 UG_{52}	—	October 17, 2006	Mount Lemmon	Mount Lemmon Survey	·	2.0 km	MPC · JPL
504214	2006 UD_{57}	—	September 20, 2006	Kitt Peak	Spacewatch	·	3.0 km	MPC · JPL
504215	2006 UX_{62}	—	September 28, 2006	Catalina	CSS	·	1.1 km	MPC · JPL
504216	2006 UM_{66}	—	June 15, 2005	Kitt Peak	Spacewatch	·	2.3 km	MPC · JPL
504217	2006 UR_{72}	—	September 30, 2006	Kitt Peak	Spacewatch	·	2.6 km	MPC · JPL
504218	2006 UR_{78}	—	October 17, 2006	Kitt Peak	Spacewatch	·	2.7 km	MPC · JPL
504219	2006 US_{93}	—	October 18, 2006	Kitt Peak	Spacewatch	·	790 m	MPC · JPL
504220	2006 UL_{97}	—	October 18, 2006	Kitt Peak	Spacewatch	·	2.4 km	MPC · JPL
504221	2006 UH_{100}	—	October 18, 2006	Kitt Peak	Spacewatch	·	760 m	MPC · JPL
504222	2006 UT_{103}	—	September 30, 2006	Mount Lemmon	Mount Lemmon Survey	·	1.0 km	MPC · JPL
504223	2006 UX_{117}	—	September 24, 2006	Kitt Peak	Spacewatch	·	2.3 km	MPC · JPL
504224	2006 UA_{122}	—	May 20, 2005	Mount Lemmon	Mount Lemmon Survey	·	830 m	MPC · JPL
504225	2006 UA_{124}	—	September 28, 2006	Kitt Peak	Spacewatch	·	2.2 km	MPC · JPL
504226	2006 UM_{132}	—	October 19, 2006	Kitt Peak	Spacewatch	·	3.8 km	MPC · JPL
504227	2006 UR_{132}	—	October 19, 2006	Kitt Peak	Spacewatch	·	2.3 km	MPC · JPL
504228	2006 UQ_{168}	—	September 19, 2006	Kitt Peak	Spacewatch	·	2.5 km	MPC · JPL
504229	2006 UW_{179}	—	October 16, 2006	Catalina	CSS	·	2.9 km	MPC · JPL
504230	2006 UW_{192}	—	October 19, 2006	Mount Lemmon	Mount Lemmon Survey	·	2.9 km	MPC · JPL
504231	2006 UZ_{197}	—	October 20, 2006	Kitt Peak	Spacewatch	THM	1.8 km	MPC · JPL
504232	2006 UR_{200}	—	July 21, 2006	Mount Lemmon	Mount Lemmon Survey	·	960 m	MPC · JPL
504233	2006 UQ_{201}	—	September 28, 2006	Mount Lemmon	Mount Lemmon Survey	·	2.3 km	MPC · JPL
504234	2006 UH_{211}	—	October 19, 2006	Kitt Peak	Spacewatch	LIX	3.2 km	MPC · JPL
504235	2006 UW_{231}	—	October 21, 2006	Kitt Peak	Spacewatch	·	830 m	MPC · JPL
504236	2006 UF_{238}	—	September 18, 2006	Kitt Peak	Spacewatch	·	1.9 km	MPC · JPL
504237	2006 UF_{239}	—	October 23, 2006	Kitt Peak	Spacewatch	·	4.2 km	MPC · JPL
504238	2006 UR_{244}	—	October 27, 2006	Mount Lemmon	Mount Lemmon Survey	THM	1.8 km	MPC · JPL
504239	2006 UO_{245}	—	October 20, 2006	Kitt Peak	Spacewatch	·	2.4 km	MPC · JPL
504240	2006 US_{254}	—	October 27, 2006	Mount Lemmon	Mount Lemmon Survey	·	1.1 km	MPC · JPL
504241	2006 UZ_{256}	—	October 28, 2006	Kitt Peak	Spacewatch	·	2.1 km	MPC · JPL
504242	2006 US_{266}	—	October 27, 2006	Kitt Peak	Spacewatch	·	950 m	MPC · JPL
504243	2006 UY_{267}	—	October 27, 2006	Catalina	CSS	·	3.6 km	MPC · JPL
504244	2006 UG_{278}	—	September 30, 2006	Mount Lemmon	Mount Lemmon Survey	·	2.8 km	MPC · JPL
504245	2006 UP_{280}	—	October 16, 2006	Kitt Peak	Spacewatch	VER	2.1 km	MPC · JPL
504246	2006 UL_{282}	—	October 28, 2006	Mount Lemmon	Mount Lemmon Survey	PHO	720 m	MPC · JPL
504247	2006 UP_{283}	—	October 13, 2006	Kitt Peak	Spacewatch	·	1.8 km	MPC · JPL
504248	2006 UD_{287}	—	October 3, 2006	Mount Lemmon	Mount Lemmon Survey	·	2.9 km	MPC · JPL
504249	2006 UT_{323}	—	September 14, 2006	Kitt Peak	Spacewatch	·	1.8 km	MPC · JPL
504250	2006 UT_{331}	—	September 17, 2006	Kitt Peak	Spacewatch	·	890 m	MPC · JPL
504251	2006 UO_{334}	—	October 20, 2006	Kitt Peak	Spacewatch	(43176)	2.4 km	MPC · JPL
504252	2006 UT_{334}	—	October 20, 2006	Mount Lemmon	Mount Lemmon Survey	·	4.5 km	MPC · JPL
504253	2006 UU_{337}	—	October 16, 2006	Kitt Peak	Spacewatch	·	2.1 km	MPC · JPL
504254	2006 UC_{361}	—	October 19, 2006	Catalina	CSS	·	1.2 km	MPC · JPL
504255	2006 VK_{9}	—	October 12, 2006	Kitt Peak	Spacewatch	MAS	580 m	MPC · JPL
504256	2006 VD_{13}	—	November 13, 2006	Socorro	LINEAR	AMO · APO · PHA	570 m	MPC · JPL
504257	2006 VU_{18}	—	October 21, 2006	Kitt Peak	Spacewatch	·	1.1 km	MPC · JPL
504258	2006 VX_{20}	—	September 28, 2006	Mount Lemmon	Mount Lemmon Survey	·	3.0 km	MPC · JPL
504259	2006 VU_{47}	—	October 27, 2006	Mount Lemmon	Mount Lemmon Survey	TIR	1.9 km	MPC · JPL
504260	2006 VW_{49}	—	November 10, 2006	Kitt Peak	Spacewatch	THB	2.8 km	MPC · JPL
504261	2006 VP_{52}	—	November 11, 2006	Kitt Peak	Spacewatch	·	1.3 km	MPC · JPL
504262	2006 VA_{66}	—	November 11, 2006	Kitt Peak	Spacewatch	·	2.1 km	MPC · JPL
504263	2006 VC_{89}	—	November 14, 2006	Socorro	LINEAR	T_{j} (2.97)	3.7 km	MPC · JPL
504264	2006 VZ_{101}	—	November 1, 2006	Mount Lemmon	Mount Lemmon Survey	·	3.2 km	MPC · JPL
504265	2006 VG_{104}	—	September 28, 2006	Catalina	CSS	·	3.4 km	MPC · JPL
504266	2006 VU_{105}	—	September 28, 2006	Mount Lemmon	Mount Lemmon Survey	·	810 m	MPC · JPL
504267	2006 VX_{105}	—	October 21, 2006	Kitt Peak	Spacewatch	·	2.6 km	MPC · JPL
504268	2006 VD_{118}	—	September 27, 2006	Mount Lemmon	Mount Lemmon Survey	·	910 m	MPC · JPL
504269	2006 VN_{143}	—	August 18, 2006	Kitt Peak	Spacewatch	·	960 m	MPC · JPL
504270	2006 VH_{173}	—	November 11, 2006	Kitt Peak	Spacewatch	·	2.8 km	MPC · JPL
504271	2006 WJ_{20}	—	September 27, 2006	Mount Lemmon	Mount Lemmon Survey	·	3.2 km	MPC · JPL
504272	2006 WR_{30}	—	September 28, 2006	Mount Lemmon	Mount Lemmon Survey	·	3.0 km	MPC · JPL
504273	2006 WV_{42}	—	November 16, 2006	Kitt Peak	Spacewatch	·	970 m	MPC · JPL
504274	2006 WO_{50}	—	November 16, 2006	Mount Lemmon	Mount Lemmon Survey	·	3.1 km	MPC · JPL
504275	2006 WK_{59}	—	November 17, 2006	Kitt Peak	Spacewatch	·	1.0 km	MPC · JPL
504276	2006 WX_{59}	—	October 4, 2006	Mount Lemmon	Mount Lemmon Survey	EUP	3.6 km	MPC · JPL
504277	2006 WV_{65}	—	November 17, 2006	Mount Lemmon	Mount Lemmon Survey	·	3.1 km	MPC · JPL
504278	2006 WB_{69}	—	November 17, 2006	Kitt Peak	Spacewatch	·	920 m	MPC · JPL
504279	2006 WJ_{85}	—	November 18, 2006	Kitt Peak	Spacewatch	·	2.9 km	MPC · JPL
504280	2006 WZ_{93}	—	October 21, 2006	Mount Lemmon	Mount Lemmon Survey	·	890 m	MPC · JPL
504281	2006 WE_{102}	—	November 13, 2006	Catalina	CSS	·	2.8 km	MPC · JPL
504282	2006 WR_{120}	—	October 21, 2006	Kitt Peak	Spacewatch	·	2.9 km	MPC · JPL
504283	2006 WZ_{135}	—	November 18, 2006	Mount Lemmon	Mount Lemmon Survey	H	500 m	MPC · JPL
504284	2006 WP_{172}	—	November 23, 2006	Kitt Peak	Spacewatch	NYS	870 m	MPC · JPL
504285	2006 XY_{12}	—	December 10, 2006	Kitt Peak	Spacewatch	MAS	730 m	MPC · JPL
504286	2006 XS_{22}	—	November 17, 2006	Kitt Peak	Spacewatch	·	1.1 km	MPC · JPL
504287	2006 XG_{24}	—	November 27, 2006	Kitt Peak	Spacewatch	T_{j} (2.97)	3.0 km	MPC · JPL
504288	2006 XK_{25}	—	September 27, 2006	Mount Lemmon	Mount Lemmon Survey	·	3.3 km	MPC · JPL
504289	2006 XC_{27}	—	December 12, 2006	Catalina	CSS	·	2.4 km	MPC · JPL
504290	2006 XP_{49}	—	November 18, 2006	Mount Lemmon	Mount Lemmon Survey	V	540 m	MPC · JPL
504291	2006 XW_{51}	—	November 11, 2006	Kitt Peak	Spacewatch	V	610 m	MPC · JPL
504292	2006 YW_{19}	—	November 25, 2006	Mount Lemmon	Mount Lemmon Survey	·	2.7 km	MPC · JPL
504293	2007 BA_{56}	—	January 24, 2007	Socorro	LINEAR	·	1.1 km	MPC · JPL
504294	2007 BG_{72}	—	December 27, 2006	Catalina	CSS	PHO	1.3 km	MPC · JPL
504295	2007 CG_{2}	—	December 20, 2006	Mount Lemmon	Mount Lemmon Survey	·	1.9 km	MPC · JPL
504296	2007 DG_{46}	—	February 21, 2007	Mount Lemmon	Mount Lemmon Survey	·	1.1 km	MPC · JPL
504297	2007 DB_{48}	—	February 21, 2007	Mount Lemmon	Mount Lemmon Survey	·	1.6 km	MPC · JPL
504298	2007 EM_{49}	—	February 25, 2007	Kitt Peak	Spacewatch	·	790 m	MPC · JPL
504299	2007 EO_{102}	—	March 11, 2007	Kitt Peak	Spacewatch	·	1.5 km	MPC · JPL
504300	2007 EF_{114}	—	March 12, 2007	Kitt Peak	Spacewatch	·	1.9 km	MPC · JPL

== 504301–504400 ==
back to top

Designation			Discovery			Properties		Ref
Permanent	Provisional	Named after	Date	Site	Discoverer(s)	Category	Diam.	Ref
504301	2007 EK_{132}	—	February 27, 2007	Kitt Peak	Spacewatch	·	1.1 km	MPC · JPL
504302	2007 EN_{224}	—	March 9, 2007	Kitt Peak	Spacewatch	T_{j} (2.96) · 3:2	5.8 km	MPC · JPL
504303	2007 GC_{44}	—	April 14, 2007	Mount Lemmon	Mount Lemmon Survey	·	1.0 km	MPC · JPL
504304	2007 GC_{45}	—	April 14, 2007	Kitt Peak	Spacewatch	·	1.0 km	MPC · JPL
504305	2007 GV_{49}	—	October 9, 2004	Kitt Peak	Spacewatch	·	1.7 km	MPC · JPL
504306	2007 HL_{22}	—	April 18, 2007	Kitt Peak	Spacewatch	3:2 · SHU	4.8 km	MPC · JPL
504307	2007 HZ_{48}	—	April 20, 2007	Kitt Peak	Spacewatch	·	1.4 km	MPC · JPL
504308	2007 HV_{51}	—	April 20, 2007	Kitt Peak	Spacewatch	·	1.1 km	MPC · JPL
504309	2007 HG_{79}	—	March 25, 2007	Mount Lemmon	Mount Lemmon Survey	·	1.8 km	MPC · JPL
504310	2007 HR_{79}	—	April 23, 2007	Mount Lemmon	Mount Lemmon Survey	·	3.8 km	MPC · JPL
504311	2007 HU_{79}	—	April 24, 2007	Kitt Peak	Spacewatch	·	1.9 km	MPC · JPL
504312	2007 LV_{1}	—	June 7, 2007	Kitt Peak	Spacewatch	EUN	1.4 km	MPC · JPL
504313	2007 LG_{14}	—	June 10, 2007	Kitt Peak	Spacewatch	·	1.7 km	MPC · JPL
504314	2007 LO_{16}	—	May 12, 2007	Mount Lemmon	Mount Lemmon Survey	HNS	1.1 km	MPC · JPL
504315	2007 RF_{24}	—	September 3, 2007	Catalina	CSS	·	560 m	MPC · JPL
504316	2007 RB_{45}	—	September 9, 2007	Kitt Peak	Spacewatch	·	620 m	MPC · JPL
504317	2007 RC_{55}	—	September 9, 2007	Kitt Peak	Spacewatch	·	2.1 km	MPC · JPL
504318	2007 RC_{97}	—	September 10, 2007	Mount Lemmon	Mount Lemmon Survey	·	620 m	MPC · JPL
504319	2007 RM_{121}	—	October 7, 2004	Kitt Peak	Spacewatch	·	530 m	MPC · JPL
504320	2007 RH_{136}	—	August 24, 2007	Kitt Peak	Spacewatch	·	1.3 km	MPC · JPL
504321	2007 RE_{141}	—	September 8, 2007	Anderson Mesa	LONEOS	(883)	690 m	MPC · JPL
504322	2007 RL_{192}	—	September 12, 2007	Catalina	CSS	·	590 m	MPC · JPL
504323	2007 RR_{199}	—	September 13, 2007	Kitt Peak	Spacewatch	·	500 m	MPC · JPL
504324	2007 RH_{269}	—	September 15, 2007	Kitt Peak	Spacewatch	EOS	1.6 km	MPC · JPL
504325	2007 RL_{287}	—	September 9, 2007	Mount Lemmon	Mount Lemmon Survey	·	570 m	MPC · JPL
504326	2007 RW_{288}	—	September 15, 2007	Mount Lemmon	Mount Lemmon Survey	·	1.6 km	MPC · JPL
504327	2007 RW_{318}	—	September 11, 2007	Mount Lemmon	Mount Lemmon Survey	KOR	1.1 km	MPC · JPL
504328	2007 SP_{7}	—	September 11, 2007	Kitt Peak	Spacewatch	·	610 m	MPC · JPL
504329	2007 TO_{27}	—	September 12, 2007	Mount Lemmon	Mount Lemmon Survey	·	510 m	MPC · JPL
504330	2007 TD_{29}	—	September 8, 2007	Mount Lemmon	Mount Lemmon Survey	·	580 m	MPC · JPL
504331	2007 TH_{81}	—	September 12, 2007	Mount Lemmon	Mount Lemmon Survey	·	670 m	MPC · JPL
504332	2007 TL_{103}	—	October 8, 2007	Mount Lemmon	Mount Lemmon Survey	·	1.5 km	MPC · JPL
504333	2007 TZ_{106}	—	September 11, 2007	Mount Lemmon	Mount Lemmon Survey	·	770 m	MPC · JPL
504334	2007 TE_{140}	—	October 9, 2007	Mount Lemmon	Mount Lemmon Survey	·	750 m	MPC · JPL
504335	2007 TH_{145}	—	October 6, 2007	Socorro	LINEAR	·	680 m	MPC · JPL
504336	2007 TA_{152}	—	October 9, 2007	Socorro	LINEAR	·	510 m	MPC · JPL
504337	2007 TS_{169}	—	October 15, 2007	Mount Lemmon	Mount Lemmon Survey	·	500 m	MPC · JPL
504338	2007 TA_{185}	—	October 9, 2007	Kitt Peak	Spacewatch	·	710 m	MPC · JPL
504339	2007 TU_{199}	—	October 8, 2007	Kitt Peak	Spacewatch	·	1.3 km	MPC · JPL
504340	2007 TH_{200}	—	October 8, 2007	Kitt Peak	Spacewatch	·	1.5 km	MPC · JPL
504341	2007 TM_{214}	—	October 7, 2007	Kitt Peak	Spacewatch	·	700 m	MPC · JPL
504342	2007 TF_{226}	—	October 8, 2007	Catalina	CSS	EOS	1.8 km	MPC · JPL
504343	2007 TK_{232}	—	October 8, 2007	Kitt Peak	Spacewatch	KOR	1.2 km	MPC · JPL
504344	2007 TP_{233}	—	October 8, 2007	Kitt Peak	Spacewatch	EOS	1.6 km	MPC · JPL
504345	2007 TX_{255}	—	October 10, 2007	Kitt Peak	Spacewatch	HOF	2.7 km	MPC · JPL
504346	2007 TB_{259}	—	October 10, 2007	Mount Lemmon	Mount Lemmon Survey	·	1.9 km	MPC · JPL
504347	2007 TQ_{308}	—	October 9, 2007	Mount Lemmon	Mount Lemmon Survey	·	1.3 km	MPC · JPL
504348	2007 TG_{316}	—	October 8, 2007	Kitt Peak	Spacewatch	·	750 m	MPC · JPL
504349	2007 TU_{316}	—	October 8, 2007	Mount Lemmon	Mount Lemmon Survey	·	1.1 km	MPC · JPL
504350	2007 TW_{320}	—	October 4, 2007	Mount Lemmon	Mount Lemmon Survey	·	2.0 km	MPC · JPL
504351	2007 TN_{331}	—	October 11, 2007	Kitt Peak	Spacewatch	·	560 m	MPC · JPL
504352	2007 TO_{338}	—	October 4, 2007	Kitt Peak	Spacewatch	·	420 m	MPC · JPL
504353	2007 TD_{367}	—	October 9, 2007	Mount Lemmon	Mount Lemmon Survey	H	540 m	MPC · JPL
504354	2007 TV_{378}	—	October 12, 2007	Kitt Peak	Spacewatch	EOS	1.2 km	MPC · JPL
504355	2007 TW_{428}	—	October 12, 2007	Kitt Peak	Spacewatch	KOR	970 m	MPC · JPL
504356	2007 TX_{428}	—	October 12, 2007	Kitt Peak	Spacewatch	KOR	1.2 km	MPC · JPL
504357	2007 UP_{29}	—	October 18, 2007	Kitt Peak	Spacewatch	PHO	740 m	MPC · JPL
504358	2007 US_{33}	—	October 16, 2007	Catalina	CSS	·	3.1 km	MPC · JPL
504359	2007 UZ_{53}	—	October 15, 2007	Kitt Peak	Spacewatch	·	2.1 km	MPC · JPL
504360	2007 UN_{85}	—	October 20, 2007	Kitt Peak	Spacewatch	·	440 m	MPC · JPL
504361	2007 UY_{86}	—	October 30, 2007	Kitt Peak	Spacewatch	·	500 m	MPC · JPL
504362	2007 UH_{90}	—	October 12, 2007	Kitt Peak	Spacewatch	KOR	1.3 km	MPC · JPL
504363	2007 UL_{93}	—	October 8, 2007	Kitt Peak	Spacewatch	NAE	2.1 km	MPC · JPL
504364	2007 US_{97}	—	October 10, 2007	Kitt Peak	Spacewatch	·	1.5 km	MPC · JPL
504365	2007 UT_{108}	—	October 15, 2007	Kitt Peak	Spacewatch	·	1.7 km	MPC · JPL
504366	2007 US_{114}	—	October 11, 2007	Kitt Peak	Spacewatch	·	1.5 km	MPC · JPL
504367	2007 VK_{9}	—	October 20, 2007	Mount Lemmon	Mount Lemmon Survey	·	550 m	MPC · JPL
504368	2007 VM_{46}	—	October 18, 2007	Kitt Peak	Spacewatch	V	820 m	MPC · JPL
504369	2007 VE_{53}	—	November 1, 2007	Kitt Peak	Spacewatch	·	650 m	MPC · JPL
504370	2007 VA_{60}	—	October 9, 2007	Kitt Peak	Spacewatch	·	2.1 km	MPC · JPL
504371	2007 VB_{60}	—	October 10, 2007	Anderson Mesa	LONEOS	·	2.5 km	MPC · JPL
504372	2007 VK_{71}	—	October 9, 2007	Catalina	CSS	H	470 m	MPC · JPL
504373	2007 VT_{72}	—	November 1, 2007	Kitt Peak	Spacewatch	·	1.6 km	MPC · JPL
504374	2007 VL_{73}	—	November 2, 2007	Kitt Peak	Spacewatch	PHO	760 m	MPC · JPL
504375	2007 VV_{73}	—	September 14, 2007	Mount Lemmon	Mount Lemmon Survey	·	520 m	MPC · JPL
504376	2007 VK_{81}	—	October 10, 2007	Kitt Peak	Spacewatch	·	1.5 km	MPC · JPL
504377	2007 VL_{94}	—	September 18, 2007	Mount Lemmon	Mount Lemmon Survey	·	700 m	MPC · JPL
504378	2007 VR_{96}	—	November 1, 2007	Kitt Peak	Spacewatch	·	630 m	MPC · JPL
504379	2007 VW_{96}	—	November 1, 2007	Kitt Peak	Spacewatch	·	630 m	MPC · JPL
504380	2007 VE_{124}	—	October 15, 2007	Mount Lemmon	Mount Lemmon Survey	·	2.2 km	MPC · JPL
504381	2007 VA_{145}	—	October 20, 2007	Mount Lemmon	Mount Lemmon Survey	·	2.4 km	MPC · JPL
504382	2007 VL_{153}	—	November 4, 2007	Kitt Peak	Spacewatch	·	650 m	MPC · JPL
504383	2007 VK_{161}	—	November 1, 2007	Kitt Peak	Spacewatch	·	1.5 km	MPC · JPL
504384	2007 VE_{170}	—	November 6, 2007	Kitt Peak	Spacewatch	·	570 m	MPC · JPL
504385	2007 VB_{185}	—	November 12, 2007	Mount Lemmon	Mount Lemmon Survey	·	680 m	MPC · JPL
504386	2007 VN_{192}	—	November 4, 2007	Mount Lemmon	Mount Lemmon Survey	·	2.1 km	MPC · JPL
504387	2007 VS_{193}	—	November 4, 2007	Mount Lemmon	Mount Lemmon Survey	(1118)	3.5 km	MPC · JPL
504388	2007 VG_{200}	—	April 2, 2006	Kitt Peak	Spacewatch	·	570 m	MPC · JPL
504389	2007 VT_{202}	—	November 7, 2007	Catalina	CSS	·	640 m	MPC · JPL
504390	2007 VB_{205}	—	October 18, 2007	Kitt Peak	Spacewatch	·	1.7 km	MPC · JPL
504391	2007 VU_{238}	—	November 5, 2007	Mount Lemmon	Mount Lemmon Survey	·	2.5 km	MPC · JPL
504392	2007 VO_{243}	—	November 15, 2007	Catalina	CSS	AMO	420 m	MPC · JPL
504393	2007 VM_{259}	—	November 2, 2007	Mount Lemmon	Mount Lemmon Survey	EOS	1.1 km	MPC · JPL
504394	2007 VL_{265}	—	November 13, 2007	Kitt Peak	Spacewatch	·	1.4 km	MPC · JPL
504395	2007 VE_{280}	—	October 17, 2007	Mount Lemmon	Mount Lemmon Survey	·	530 m	MPC · JPL
504396	2007 VL_{288}	—	November 12, 2007	Mount Lemmon	Mount Lemmon Survey	·	430 m	MPC · JPL
504397	2007 VA_{310}	—	November 5, 2007	Mount Lemmon	Mount Lemmon Survey	·	1.8 km	MPC · JPL
504398	2007 VL_{316}	—	November 5, 2007	Mount Lemmon	Mount Lemmon Survey	EOS	1.9 km	MPC · JPL
504399	2007 VZ_{316}	—	November 12, 2007	Mount Lemmon	Mount Lemmon Survey	·	1.9 km	MPC · JPL
504400	2007 VA_{323}	—	November 2, 2007	Kitt Peak	Spacewatch	·	670 m	MPC · JPL

== 504401–504500 ==
back to top

Designation			Discovery			Properties		Ref
Permanent	Provisional	Named after	Date	Site	Discoverer(s)	Category	Diam.	Ref
504401	2007 VY_{331}	—	November 7, 2007	Mount Lemmon	Mount Lemmon Survey	·	2.1 km	MPC · JPL
504402	2007 WM_{1}	—	October 9, 2007	Kitt Peak	Spacewatch	·	1.6 km	MPC · JPL
504403	2007 WF_{15}	—	November 18, 2007	Mount Lemmon	Mount Lemmon Survey	KOR	1.1 km	MPC · JPL
504404	2007 WM_{36}	—	November 19, 2007	Mount Lemmon	Mount Lemmon Survey	·	1.9 km	MPC · JPL
504405	2007 WR_{45}	—	October 21, 2007	Mount Lemmon	Mount Lemmon Survey	EOS	1.4 km	MPC · JPL
504406	2007 WB_{62}	—	December 3, 2007	Mayhill	W. G. Dillon, D. Wells	·	620 m	MPC · JPL
504407	2007 XD_{16}	—	November 2, 2007	Kitt Peak	Spacewatch	·	650 m	MPC · JPL
504408	2007 XM_{21}	—	November 4, 2007	Kitt Peak	Spacewatch	·	1.9 km	MPC · JPL
504409	2007 XM_{36}	—	December 13, 2007	Socorro	LINEAR	·	2.3 km	MPC · JPL
504410	2007 XZ_{51}	—	December 5, 2007	Kitt Peak	Spacewatch	H	490 m	MPC · JPL
504411	2007 XO_{52}	—	December 15, 2007	Kitt Peak	Spacewatch	·	1.9 km	MPC · JPL
504412	2007 XK_{58}	—	December 5, 2007	Kitt Peak	Spacewatch	·	2.7 km	MPC · JPL
504413	2007 YF_{5}	—	December 16, 2007	Catalina	CSS	TIR	2.6 km	MPC · JPL
504414	2007 YH_{18}	—	December 4, 2007	Kitt Peak	Spacewatch	·	2.9 km	MPC · JPL
504415	2007 YW_{19}	—	December 3, 2007	Kitt Peak	Spacewatch	·	540 m	MPC · JPL
504416	2007 YM_{24}	—	December 5, 2007	Kitt Peak	Spacewatch	·	1.7 km	MPC · JPL
504417	2007 YF_{66}	—	December 30, 2007	Mount Lemmon	Mount Lemmon Survey	·	1.9 km	MPC · JPL
504418	2007 YM_{68}	—	December 31, 2007	Mount Lemmon	Mount Lemmon Survey	V	650 m	MPC · JPL
504419	2007 YS_{70}	—	December 30, 2007	Kitt Peak	Spacewatch	·	570 m	MPC · JPL
504420	2007 YK_{73}	—	December 30, 2007	Kitt Peak	Spacewatch	·	2.8 km	MPC · JPL
504421	2008 AC_{10}	—	January 10, 2008	Mount Lemmon	Mount Lemmon Survey	·	1.6 km	MPC · JPL
504422	2008 AL_{14}	—	January 10, 2008	Mount Lemmon	Mount Lemmon Survey	·	3.0 km	MPC · JPL
504423	2008 AZ_{28}	—	January 3, 2008	Calvin-Rehoboth	Calvin College	·	2.0 km	MPC · JPL
504424	2008 AB_{41}	—	January 10, 2008	Mount Lemmon	Mount Lemmon Survey	·	1.8 km	MPC · JPL
504425	2008 AV_{44}	—	January 10, 2008	Kitt Peak	Spacewatch	H	390 m	MPC · JPL
504426	2008 AW_{50}	—	November 12, 2007	Mount Lemmon	Mount Lemmon Survey	·	1.4 km	MPC · JPL
504427	2008 AW_{53}	—	December 14, 2007	Mount Lemmon	Mount Lemmon Survey	·	2.8 km	MPC · JPL
504428	2008 AN_{55}	—	December 30, 2007	Kitt Peak	Spacewatch	·	600 m	MPC · JPL
504429	2008 AJ_{56}	—	January 11, 2008	Kitt Peak	Spacewatch	EOS	1.6 km	MPC · JPL
504430	2008 AR_{56}	—	December 30, 2007	Kitt Peak	Spacewatch	V	580 m	MPC · JPL
504431	2008 AH_{59}	—	December 30, 2007	Kitt Peak	Spacewatch	·	2.3 km	MPC · JPL
504432	2008 AP_{80}	—	January 12, 2008	Kitt Peak	Spacewatch	VER	2.4 km	MPC · JPL
504433	2008 AV_{93}	—	December 31, 2007	Kitt Peak	Spacewatch	·	630 m	MPC · JPL
504434	2008 AQ_{97}	—	September 25, 2006	Kitt Peak	Spacewatch	NYS	940 m	MPC · JPL
504435	2008 AM_{116}	—	January 1, 2008	Kitt Peak	Spacewatch	·	2.6 km	MPC · JPL
504436	2008 AN_{117}	—	January 11, 2008	Mount Lemmon	Mount Lemmon Survey	·	2.5 km	MPC · JPL
504437	2008 AB_{128}	—	January 11, 2008	Mount Lemmon	Mount Lemmon Survey	·	1.3 km	MPC · JPL
504438	2008 BD_{17}	—	December 15, 2007	Mount Lemmon	Mount Lemmon Survey	·	2.2 km	MPC · JPL
504439	2008 BR_{42}	—	January 31, 2008	Mount Lemmon	Mount Lemmon Survey	H	430 m	MPC · JPL
504440	2008 BA_{43}	—	December 31, 2007	Mount Lemmon	Mount Lemmon Survey	GAL	1.7 km	MPC · JPL
504441	2008 BU_{46}	—	January 30, 2008	Mount Lemmon	Mount Lemmon Survey	V	620 m	MPC · JPL
504442	2008 BF_{52}	—	January 19, 2008	Mount Lemmon	Mount Lemmon Survey	·	2.4 km	MPC · JPL
504443	2008 CU	—	February 2, 2008	Vail-Jarnac	Jarnac	·	2.4 km	MPC · JPL
504444	2008 CK_{9}	—	January 10, 2008	Kitt Peak	Spacewatch	·	2.6 km	MPC · JPL
504445	2008 CR_{57}	—	January 16, 2008	Kitt Peak	Spacewatch	·	2.4 km	MPC · JPL
504446	2008 CC_{75}	—	February 10, 2008	Altschwendt	W. Ries	·	1.7 km	MPC · JPL
504447	2008 CF_{77}	—	December 30, 2007	Mount Lemmon	Mount Lemmon Survey	LIX	3.5 km	MPC · JPL
504448	2008 CR_{91}	—	February 8, 2008	Kitt Peak	Spacewatch	·	980 m	MPC · JPL
504449	2008 CK_{110}	—	February 9, 2008	Purple Mountain	PMO NEO Survey Program	·	860 m	MPC · JPL
504450	2008 CO_{118}	—	January 31, 2008	Mount Lemmon	Mount Lemmon Survey	H	460 m	MPC · JPL
504451	2008 CV_{124}	—	February 7, 2008	Kitt Peak	Spacewatch	·	670 m	MPC · JPL
504452	2008 CJ_{127}	—	January 30, 2008	Mount Lemmon	Mount Lemmon Survey	·	3.0 km	MPC · JPL
504453	2008 CH_{129}	—	February 8, 2008	Kitt Peak	Spacewatch	·	1.5 km	MPC · JPL
504454	2008 CK_{142}	—	February 8, 2008	Kitt Peak	Spacewatch	·	760 m	MPC · JPL
504455	2008 CS_{162}	—	January 10, 2008	Mount Lemmon	Mount Lemmon Survey	·	2.7 km	MPC · JPL
504456	2008 CC_{163}	—	January 31, 2008	Mount Lemmon	Mount Lemmon Survey	·	2.7 km	MPC · JPL
504457	2008 CY_{185}	—	December 31, 2007	Mount Lemmon	Mount Lemmon Survey	H	490 m	MPC · JPL
504458	2008 CZ_{189}	—	January 12, 2008	Catalina	CSS	PHO	1.2 km	MPC · JPL
504459	2008 CF_{209}	—	April 2, 2005	Mount Lemmon	Mount Lemmon Survey	·	990 m	MPC · JPL
504460	2008 CX_{209}	—	February 8, 2008	Kitt Peak	Spacewatch	TIR	2.7 km	MPC · JPL
504461	2008 CQ_{210}	—	February 2, 2008	Mount Lemmon	Mount Lemmon Survey	NYS	1.0 km	MPC · JPL
504462	2008 CF_{211}	—	February 3, 2008	Kitt Peak	Spacewatch	·	1.1 km	MPC · JPL
504463	2008 DU_{9}	—	January 12, 2008	Kitt Peak	Spacewatch	·	2.9 km	MPC · JPL
504464	2008 DS_{20}	—	February 28, 2008	Catalina	CSS	·	2.5 km	MPC · JPL
504465	2008 DN_{29}	—	January 11, 2008	Kitt Peak	Spacewatch	EOS	1.6 km	MPC · JPL
504466	2008 DQ_{45}	—	October 18, 2007	Mount Lemmon	Mount Lemmon Survey	LIX	3.3 km	MPC · JPL
504467	2008 DR_{50}	—	April 7, 2003	Kitt Peak	Spacewatch	·	3.2 km	MPC · JPL
504468	2008 DT_{55}	—	February 27, 2008	Kitt Peak	Spacewatch	H	400 m	MPC · JPL
504469	2008 DA_{62}	—	February 28, 2008	Mount Lemmon	Mount Lemmon Survey	·	2.3 km	MPC · JPL
504470	2008 DZ_{67}	—	February 29, 2008	Kitt Peak	Spacewatch	H	480 m	MPC · JPL
504471	2008 DW_{83}	—	February 2, 2008	Mount Lemmon	Mount Lemmon Survey	MAS	670 m	MPC · JPL
504472	2008 DA_{86}	—	February 24, 2008	Kitt Peak	Spacewatch	·	2.5 km	MPC · JPL
504473	2008 ER_{23}	—	March 3, 2008	Kitt Peak	Spacewatch	H	380 m	MPC · JPL
504474	2008 EM_{40}	—	March 4, 2008	Kitt Peak	Spacewatch	·	1.1 km	MPC · JPL
504475	2008 EV_{45}	—	March 2, 2008	Mount Lemmon	Mount Lemmon Survey	·	890 m	MPC · JPL
504476	2008 EN_{76}	—	March 7, 2008	Kitt Peak	Spacewatch	H	420 m	MPC · JPL
504477	2008 EK_{87}	—	March 3, 2008	XuYi	PMO NEO Survey Program	EUP	3.5 km	MPC · JPL
504478	2008 EJ_{106}	—	February 9, 2008	Kitt Peak	Spacewatch	·	3.0 km	MPC · JPL
504479	2008 ES_{106}	—	March 6, 2008	Mount Lemmon	Mount Lemmon Survey	·	2.9 km	MPC · JPL
504480	2008 EN_{149}	—	March 4, 2008	Mount Lemmon	Mount Lemmon Survey	·	1.2 km	MPC · JPL
504481	2008 FA_{27}	—	March 27, 2008	Kitt Peak	Spacewatch	·	2.9 km	MPC · JPL
504482	2008 FP_{31}	—	March 28, 2008	Mount Lemmon	Mount Lemmon Survey	HYG	2.3 km	MPC · JPL
504483	2008 FE_{72}	—	February 10, 2008	Kitt Peak	Spacewatch	·	780 m	MPC · JPL
504484	2008 FL_{103}	—	March 30, 2008	Kitt Peak	Spacewatch	·	1.2 km	MPC · JPL
504485	2008 FV_{119}	—	February 9, 2008	Mount Lemmon	Mount Lemmon Survey	·	2.8 km	MPC · JPL
504486	2008 FO_{120}	—	March 11, 2008	Mount Lemmon	Mount Lemmon Survey	·	1.0 km	MPC · JPL
504487	2008 FN_{124}	—	March 30, 2008	Kitt Peak	Spacewatch	H	390 m	MPC · JPL
504488	2008 FK_{126}	—	March 29, 2008	Kitt Peak	Spacewatch	SUL	1.9 km	MPC · JPL
504489	2008 GE_{16}	—	April 3, 2008	Mount Lemmon	Mount Lemmon Survey	·	2.5 km	MPC · JPL
504490	2008 GD_{27}	—	March 6, 2008	Mount Lemmon	Mount Lemmon Survey	·	2.6 km	MPC · JPL
504491	2008 GD_{101}	—	April 1, 2008	Kitt Peak	Spacewatch	MAS	620 m	MPC · JPL
504492	2008 GK_{112}	—	April 8, 2008	Catalina	CSS	·	1.4 km	MPC · JPL
504493	2008 GD_{114}	—	April 9, 2008	Kitt Peak	Spacewatch	·	980 m	MPC · JPL
504494	2008 HN_{5}	—	April 24, 2008	Kitt Peak	Spacewatch	MAS	630 m	MPC · JPL
504495	2008 HT_{47}	—	April 28, 2008	Kitt Peak	Spacewatch	H	550 m	MPC · JPL
504496	2008 JZ_{3}	—	September 25, 2006	Mount Lemmon	Mount Lemmon Survey	H	440 m	MPC · JPL
504497	2008 JZ_{19}	—	May 1, 2008	Catalina	CSS	BAR	1.5 km	MPC · JPL
504498	2008 JH_{27}	—	April 6, 2008	Mount Lemmon	Mount Lemmon Survey	H	550 m	MPC · JPL
504499	2008 KQ_{12}	—	May 3, 2008	Mount Lemmon	Mount Lemmon Survey	·	1.0 km	MPC · JPL
504500	2008 KF_{30}	—	April 27, 2008	Mount Lemmon	Mount Lemmon Survey	EUN	890 m	MPC · JPL

== 504501–504600 ==
back to top

Designation			Discovery			Properties		Ref
Permanent	Provisional	Named after	Date	Site	Discoverer(s)	Category	Diam.	Ref
504501	2008 LD_{2}	—	June 3, 2008	Mount Lemmon	Mount Lemmon Survey	H	530 m	MPC · JPL
504502	2008 LX_{4}	—	June 3, 2008	Mount Lemmon	Mount Lemmon Survey	·	1.1 km	MPC · JPL
504503	2008 LM_{10}	—	April 30, 2008	Mount Lemmon	Mount Lemmon Survey	H	540 m	MPC · JPL
504504	2008 MS	—	June 26, 2008	La Sagra	OAM	·	1.2 km	MPC · JPL
504505	2008 MH_{1}	—	June 28, 2008	Siding Spring	SSS	AMO	780 m	MPC · JPL
504506	2008 MX_{1}	—	June 30, 2008	Eskridge	G. Hug	·	1.4 km	MPC · JPL
504507	2008 NB_{2}	—	July 5, 2008	La Sagra	OAM	·	2.2 km	MPC · JPL
504508	2008 OS_{22}	—	July 29, 2008	Kitt Peak	Spacewatch	·	1.3 km	MPC · JPL
504509	2008 PS_{10}	—	August 8, 2008	La Sagra	OAM	JUN	1.1 km	MPC · JPL
504510	2008 PO_{19}	—	August 7, 2008	Kitt Peak	Spacewatch	HNS	910 m	MPC · JPL
504511	2008 QT_{13}	—	August 26, 2008	Piszkéstető	K. Sárneczky	·	1.3 km	MPC · JPL
504512	2008 QO_{21}	—	August 5, 2008	La Sagra	OAM	·	1.7 km	MPC · JPL
504513	2008 QQ_{27}	—	July 1, 2008	Catalina	CSS	BAR	1.2 km	MPC · JPL
504514	2008 QC_{32}	—	August 30, 2008	Socorro	LINEAR	·	2.0 km	MPC · JPL
504515	2008 QT_{46}	—	August 30, 2008	Socorro	LINEAR	·	2.1 km	MPC · JPL
504516	2008 RL_{5}	—	September 2, 2008	Kitt Peak	Spacewatch	·	1.4 km	MPC · JPL
504517	2008 RA_{6}	—	September 2, 2008	Molėtai	K. Černis, J. Zdanavičius	MAR	1.2 km	MPC · JPL
504518	2008 RP_{15}	—	August 24, 2008	Kitt Peak	Spacewatch	·	1.5 km	MPC · JPL
504519	2008 RH_{37}	—	September 2, 2008	Kitt Peak	Spacewatch	·	1.2 km	MPC · JPL
504520	2008 RA_{51}	—	September 3, 2008	Kitt Peak	Spacewatch	·	1.8 km	MPC · JPL
504521	2008 RC_{52}	—	September 3, 2008	Kitt Peak	Spacewatch	·	1.5 km	MPC · JPL
504522	2008 RE_{68}	—	September 4, 2008	Kitt Peak	Spacewatch	·	1.5 km	MPC · JPL
504523	2008 RX_{68}	—	September 4, 2008	Kitt Peak	Spacewatch	·	1.6 km	MPC · JPL
504524	2008 RO_{72}	—	September 6, 2008	Mount Lemmon	Mount Lemmon Survey	·	1.4 km	MPC · JPL
504525	2008 RD_{86}	—	September 5, 2008	Kitt Peak	Spacewatch	·	1.6 km	MPC · JPL
504526	2008 RK_{89}	—	September 5, 2008	Kitt Peak	Spacewatch	·	1.5 km	MPC · JPL
504527	2008 RY_{103}	—	September 5, 2008	Kitt Peak	Spacewatch	·	1.9 km	MPC · JPL
504528	2008 RZ_{103}	—	September 5, 2008	Kitt Peak	Spacewatch	·	1.5 km	MPC · JPL
504529	2008 RQ_{121}	—	September 2, 2008	Kitt Peak	Spacewatch	·	1.3 km	MPC · JPL
504530	2008 RD_{135}	—	February 1, 2006	Kitt Peak	Spacewatch	·	1.6 km	MPC · JPL
504531	2008 RR_{144}	—	September 5, 2008	Kitt Peak	Spacewatch	·	1.8 km	MPC · JPL
504532	2008 SH_{2}	—	September 22, 2008	Goodricke-Pigott	R. A. Tucker	·	1.5 km	MPC · JPL
504533	2008 SS_{15}	—	September 7, 2008	Mount Lemmon	Mount Lemmon Survey	·	1.4 km	MPC · JPL
504534	2008 SH_{20}	—	September 19, 2008	Kitt Peak	Spacewatch	·	1.4 km	MPC · JPL
504535	2008 SX_{46}	—	September 20, 2008	Kitt Peak	Spacewatch	·	1.2 km	MPC · JPL
504536	2008 SF_{48}	—	September 2, 2008	Kitt Peak	Spacewatch	·	1.7 km	MPC · JPL
504537	2008 SG_{55}	—	September 20, 2008	Mount Lemmon	Mount Lemmon Survey	·	1.5 km	MPC · JPL
504538	2008 SR_{61}	—	July 30, 2008	Mount Lemmon	Mount Lemmon Survey	·	1.3 km	MPC · JPL
504539	2008 ST_{90}	—	September 21, 2008	Kitt Peak	Spacewatch	·	1.5 km	MPC · JPL
504540	2008 SZ_{94}	—	September 21, 2008	Kitt Peak	Spacewatch	NEM	2.0 km	MPC · JPL
504541	2008 SP_{95}	—	September 21, 2008	Kitt Peak	Spacewatch	·	1.6 km	MPC · JPL
504542	2008 SD_{117}	—	September 22, 2008	Mount Lemmon	Mount Lemmon Survey	·	1.9 km	MPC · JPL
504543	2008 SJ_{125}	—	September 22, 2008	Mount Lemmon	Mount Lemmon Survey	·	1.4 km	MPC · JPL
504544	2008 SQ_{125}	—	September 22, 2008	Mount Lemmon	Mount Lemmon Survey	MRX	940 m	MPC · JPL
504545	2008 SY_{131}	—	September 22, 2008	Kitt Peak	Spacewatch	PAD	1.4 km	MPC · JPL
504546	2008 SX_{139}	—	August 24, 2008	Kitt Peak	Spacewatch	·	1.4 km	MPC · JPL
504547	2008 SX_{140}	—	September 6, 2008	Mount Lemmon	Mount Lemmon Survey	·	1.9 km	MPC · JPL
504548	2008 SC_{147}	—	September 6, 2008	Mount Lemmon	Mount Lemmon Survey	·	1.8 km	MPC · JPL
504549	2008 SJ_{194}	—	September 21, 2008	Kitt Peak	Spacewatch	AEO	920 m	MPC · JPL
504550	2008 SZ_{210}	—	September 28, 2008	Catalina	CSS	·	1.6 km	MPC · JPL
504551	2008 SW_{229}	—	September 5, 2008	Kitt Peak	Spacewatch	·	1.4 km	MPC · JPL
504552	2008 SK_{260}	—	September 23, 2008	Kitt Peak	Spacewatch	WIT	780 m	MPC · JPL
504553	2008 SQ_{260}	—	September 23, 2008	Kitt Peak	Spacewatch	AGN	960 m	MPC · JPL
504554	2008 SK_{265}	—	September 28, 2008	Catalina	CSS	·	1.6 km	MPC · JPL
504555	2008 SO_{266}	—	September 24, 2008	Palomar	M. E. Schwamb, M. E. Brown, D. L. Rabinowitz	plutino	259 km	MPC · JPL
504556	2008 SM_{277}	—	September 24, 2008	Mount Lemmon	Mount Lemmon Survey	·	1.4 km	MPC · JPL
504557	2008 SB_{281}	—	September 24, 2008	Mount Lemmon	Mount Lemmon Survey	·	2.1 km	MPC · JPL
504558	2008 SQ_{288}	—	September 24, 2008	Mount Lemmon	Mount Lemmon Survey	·	1.4 km	MPC · JPL
504559	2008 SW_{288}	—	September 24, 2008	Mount Lemmon	Mount Lemmon Survey	NEM	2.2 km	MPC · JPL
504560	2008 SQ_{291}	—	September 24, 2008	Catalina	CSS	·	1.6 km	MPC · JPL
504561	2008 SG_{298}	—	September 21, 2008	Kitt Peak	Spacewatch	·	1.1 km	MPC · JPL
504562	2008 SO_{304}	—	September 24, 2008	Kitt Peak	Spacewatch	·	1.4 km	MPC · JPL
504563	2008 SF_{305}	—	September 26, 2008	Kitt Peak	Spacewatch	·	1.4 km	MPC · JPL
504564	2008 TB_{10}	—	October 7, 2008	Tiki	Teamo, N.	·	1.9 km	MPC · JPL
504565	2008 TS_{16}	—	October 1, 2008	Kitt Peak	Spacewatch	·	1.4 km	MPC · JPL
504566	2008 TQ_{17}	—	September 6, 2008	Mount Lemmon	Mount Lemmon Survey	·	2.0 km	MPC · JPL
504567	2008 TN_{21}	—	October 1, 2008	Mount Lemmon	Mount Lemmon Survey	·	1.4 km	MPC · JPL
504568	2008 TO_{26}	—	October 9, 2008	Catalina	CSS	·	300 m	MPC · JPL
504569	2008 TL_{34}	—	September 20, 2008	Kitt Peak	Spacewatch	·	1.6 km	MPC · JPL
504570	2008 TC_{36}	—	October 1, 2008	Mount Lemmon	Mount Lemmon Survey	·	1.5 km	MPC · JPL
504571	2008 TV_{38}	—	October 1, 2008	Kitt Peak	Spacewatch	AGN	1.1 km	MPC · JPL
504572	2008 TF_{50}	—	October 2, 2008	Kitt Peak	Spacewatch	·	1.5 km	MPC · JPL
504573	2008 TM_{50}	—	October 2, 2008	Kitt Peak	Spacewatch	MIS	2.1 km	MPC · JPL
504574	2008 TG_{59}	—	October 2, 2008	Kitt Peak	Spacewatch	PAD	1.9 km	MPC · JPL
504575	2008 TY_{67}	—	September 23, 2008	Kitt Peak	Spacewatch	·	1.9 km	MPC · JPL
504576	2008 TK_{70}	—	September 23, 2008	Kitt Peak	Spacewatch	·	1.4 km	MPC · JPL
504577	2008 TY_{95}	—	September 25, 2008	Kitt Peak	Spacewatch	·	1.6 km	MPC · JPL
504578	2008 TC_{107}	—	October 6, 2008	Mount Lemmon	Mount Lemmon Survey	·	1.2 km	MPC · JPL
504579	2008 TV_{107}	—	October 6, 2008	Mount Lemmon	Mount Lemmon Survey	T_{j} (2.98) · 3:2	4.0 km	MPC · JPL
504580	2008 TJ_{109}	—	October 6, 2008	Mount Lemmon	Mount Lemmon Survey	(1547)	1.3 km	MPC · JPL
504581	2008 TB_{132}	—	September 23, 2008	Kitt Peak	Spacewatch	·	1.9 km	MPC · JPL
504582	2008 TT_{138}	—	October 8, 2008	Mount Lemmon	Mount Lemmon Survey	GEF	870 m	MPC · JPL
504583	2008 TX_{152}	—	October 9, 2008	Kitt Peak	Spacewatch	·	1.1 km	MPC · JPL
504584	2008 TB_{184}	—	October 3, 2008	La Sagra	OAM	·	1.7 km	MPC · JPL
504585	2008 TN_{188}	—	October 9, 2008	Kitt Peak	Spacewatch	DOR	1.7 km	MPC · JPL
504586	2008 UY_{7}	—	October 2, 2008	Kitt Peak	Spacewatch	·	1.5 km	MPC · JPL
504587	2008 UK_{10}	—	October 17, 2008	Kitt Peak	Spacewatch	·	1.4 km	MPC · JPL
504588	2008 UY_{18}	—	September 22, 2008	Mount Lemmon	Mount Lemmon Survey	·	1.4 km	MPC · JPL
504589	2008 UY_{28}	—	October 20, 2008	Kitt Peak	Spacewatch	WIT	840 m	MPC · JPL
504590	2008 UG_{50}	—	September 25, 2008	Kitt Peak	Spacewatch	·	1.6 km	MPC · JPL
504591	2008 UM_{55}	—	October 21, 2008	Kitt Peak	Spacewatch	·	1.3 km	MPC · JPL
504592	2008 UW_{62}	—	October 21, 2008	Kitt Peak	Spacewatch	·	2.0 km	MPC · JPL
504593	2008 UB_{65}	—	October 21, 2008	Kitt Peak	Spacewatch	·	1.4 km	MPC · JPL
504594	2008 UE_{74}	—	October 21, 2008	Kitt Peak	Spacewatch	·	2.5 km	MPC · JPL
504595	2008 UR_{79}	—	October 22, 2008	Kitt Peak	Spacewatch	·	2.0 km	MPC · JPL
504596	2008 UP_{106}	—	October 21, 2008	Kitt Peak	Spacewatch	JUN	940 m	MPC · JPL
504597	2008 UH_{113}	—	October 22, 2008	Kitt Peak	Spacewatch	·	1.6 km	MPC · JPL
504598	2008 UQ_{113}	—	October 22, 2008	Kitt Peak	Spacewatch	AEO	890 m	MPC · JPL
504599	2008 UP_{116}	—	October 22, 2008	Kitt Peak	Spacewatch	WIT	850 m	MPC · JPL
504600	2008 UR_{121}	—	October 22, 2008	Kitt Peak	Spacewatch	·	1.7 km	MPC · JPL

== 504601–504700 ==
back to top

Designation			Discovery			Properties		Ref
Permanent	Provisional	Named after	Date	Site	Discoverer(s)	Category	Diam.	Ref
504601	2008 UD_{126}	—	October 22, 2008	Kitt Peak	Spacewatch	AGN	1.0 km	MPC · JPL
504602	2008 UH_{134}	—	September 6, 2008	Mount Lemmon	Mount Lemmon Survey	·	1.6 km	MPC · JPL
504603	2008 UT_{139}	—	October 29, 1999	Kitt Peak	Spacewatch	·	1.6 km	MPC · JPL
504604	2008 UP_{143}	—	October 23, 2008	Kitt Peak	Spacewatch	·	1.2 km	MPC · JPL
504605	2008 UT_{147}	—	October 23, 2008	Kitt Peak	Spacewatch	·	1.6 km	MPC · JPL
504606	2008 UM_{153}	—	October 23, 2008	Mount Lemmon	Mount Lemmon Survey	·	1.4 km	MPC · JPL
504607	2008 UC_{159}	—	October 23, 2008	Kitt Peak	Spacewatch	·	1.7 km	MPC · JPL
504608	2008 UL_{160}	—	October 23, 2008	Kitt Peak	Spacewatch	EUN	1.2 km	MPC · JPL
504609	2008 UU_{171}	—	October 24, 2008	Kitt Peak	Spacewatch	·	1.4 km	MPC · JPL
504610	2008 UT_{188}	—	October 25, 2008	Kitt Peak	Spacewatch	·	1.5 km	MPC · JPL
504611	2008 UO_{194}	—	October 6, 2008	Mount Lemmon	Mount Lemmon Survey	·	1.3 km	MPC · JPL
504612	2008 UK_{233}	—	October 26, 2008	Kitt Peak	Spacewatch	·	1.6 km	MPC · JPL
504613	2008 UX_{259}	—	October 27, 2008	Kitt Peak	Spacewatch	(13314)	1.3 km	MPC · JPL
504614	2008 UG_{264}	—	October 28, 2008	Kitt Peak	Spacewatch	·	1.7 km	MPC · JPL
504615	2008 UN_{268}	—	October 20, 2008	Kitt Peak	Spacewatch	AGN	1.0 km	MPC · JPL
504616	2008 UB_{277}	—	October 28, 2008	Mount Lemmon	Mount Lemmon Survey	·	1.5 km	MPC · JPL
504617	2008 UA_{313}	—	October 25, 2008	Mount Lemmon	Mount Lemmon Survey	HOF	2.2 km	MPC · JPL
504618	2008 UF_{314}	—	October 10, 2008	Mount Lemmon	Mount Lemmon Survey	·	2.0 km	MPC · JPL
504619	2008 UG_{314}	—	October 30, 2008	Mount Lemmon	Mount Lemmon Survey	·	2.4 km	MPC · JPL
504620	2008 UK_{317}	—	September 24, 2008	Catalina	CSS	·	2.2 km	MPC · JPL
504621	2008 UQ_{323}	—	October 31, 2008	Catalina	CSS	·	1.8 km	MPC · JPL
504622	2008 UK_{342}	—	October 28, 2008	Mount Lemmon	Mount Lemmon Survey	·	1.7 km	MPC · JPL
504623	2008 UN_{347}	—	October 22, 2008	Kitt Peak	Spacewatch	·	1.6 km	MPC · JPL
504624	2008 UL_{350}	—	October 20, 2008	Kitt Peak	Spacewatch	·	1.7 km	MPC · JPL
504625	2008 UO_{357}	—	October 24, 2008	Catalina	CSS	·	1.5 km	MPC · JPL
504626	2008 UN_{358}	—	October 26, 2008	Mount Lemmon	Mount Lemmon Survey	·	2.0 km	MPC · JPL
504627	2008 UL_{360}	—	October 25, 2008	Kitt Peak	Spacewatch	AGN	930 m	MPC · JPL
504628	2008 VY_{13}	—	November 2, 2008	Mount Lemmon	Mount Lemmon Survey	·	2.4 km	MPC · JPL
504629	2008 VG_{15}	—	September 29, 2008	Kitt Peak	Spacewatch	HOF	2.3 km	MPC · JPL
504630	2008 VB_{49}	—	October 26, 2008	Kitt Peak	Spacewatch	·	1.4 km	MPC · JPL
504631	2008 VF_{69}	—	November 6, 2008	Mount Lemmon	Mount Lemmon Survey	AGN	1.3 km	MPC · JPL
504632	2008 WO_{4}	—	October 31, 2008	Kitt Peak	Spacewatch	·	1.7 km	MPC · JPL
504633	2008 WR_{32}	—	September 29, 2008	Mount Lemmon	Mount Lemmon Survey	·	1.7 km	MPC · JPL
504634	2008 WA_{44}	—	November 17, 2008	Kitt Peak	Spacewatch	(13314)	1.5 km	MPC · JPL
504635	2008 WJ_{59}	—	September 23, 2008	Mount Lemmon	Mount Lemmon Survey	·	1.6 km	MPC · JPL
504636	2008 WZ_{61}	—	September 7, 2008	Mount Lemmon	Mount Lemmon Survey	·	2.1 km	MPC · JPL
504637	2008 WG_{77}	—	November 7, 2008	Mount Lemmon	Mount Lemmon Survey	·	1.6 km	MPC · JPL
504638	2008 WX_{89}	—	November 2, 2008	Mount Lemmon	Mount Lemmon Survey	·	2.5 km	MPC · JPL
504639	2008 WB_{109}	—	November 30, 2008	Kitt Peak	Spacewatch	AGN	1.0 km	MPC · JPL
504640	2008 WG_{123}	—	November 17, 2008	Kitt Peak	Spacewatch	·	1.7 km	MPC · JPL
504641	2008 WY_{127}	—	November 21, 2008	Kitt Peak	Spacewatch	AST	1.5 km	MPC · JPL
504642	2008 WD_{128}	—	November 18, 2008	Kitt Peak	Spacewatch	·	1.8 km	MPC · JPL
504643	2008 WE_{134}	—	September 27, 2008	Mount Lemmon	Mount Lemmon Survey	·	1.3 km	MPC · JPL
504644	2008 XL_{4}	—	November 19, 2008	Kitt Peak	Spacewatch	·	2.2 km	MPC · JPL
504645	2008 XF_{33}	—	October 3, 2008	Mount Lemmon	Mount Lemmon Survey	AEO	950 m	MPC · JPL
504646	2008 XD_{34}	—	October 29, 2008	Kitt Peak	Spacewatch	·	1.6 km	MPC · JPL
504647	2008 XW_{38}	—	December 2, 2008	Kitt Peak	Spacewatch	·	1.8 km	MPC · JPL
504648	2008 YP_{1}	—	September 29, 2008	Mount Lemmon	Mount Lemmon Survey	·	1.6 km	MPC · JPL
504649	2008 YQ_{39}	—	December 29, 2008	Mount Lemmon	Mount Lemmon Survey	·	2.0 km	MPC · JPL
504650	2008 YM_{102}	—	December 29, 2008	Kitt Peak	Spacewatch	·	480 m	MPC · JPL
504651	2008 YS_{122}	—	December 22, 2008	Mount Lemmon	Mount Lemmon Survey	·	2.2 km	MPC · JPL
504652	2008 YY_{150}	—	December 22, 2008	Kitt Peak	Spacewatch	·	1.7 km	MPC · JPL
504653	2008 YQ_{152}	—	December 29, 2008	Kitt Peak	Spacewatch	·	1.8 km	MPC · JPL
504654	2008 YO_{154}	—	December 22, 2008	Kitt Peak	Spacewatch	·	4.1 km	MPC · JPL
504655	2008 YT_{156}	—	December 30, 2008	Mount Lemmon	Mount Lemmon Survey	KOR	1.1 km	MPC · JPL
504656	2008 YJ_{160}	—	December 30, 2008	Mount Lemmon	Mount Lemmon Survey	·	2.8 km	MPC · JPL
504657	2009 AD_{18}	—	November 1, 2008	Mount Lemmon	Mount Lemmon Survey	·	2.1 km	MPC · JPL
504658	2009 AH_{25}	—	December 21, 2008	Kitt Peak	Spacewatch	·	1.8 km	MPC · JPL
504659	2009 AK_{29}	—	December 22, 2008	Kitt Peak	Spacewatch	NAE	2.5 km	MPC · JPL
504660	2009 AT_{32}	—	January 15, 2009	Kitt Peak	Spacewatch	·	1.1 km	MPC · JPL
504661	2009 AS_{35}	—	December 21, 2008	Kitt Peak	Spacewatch	·	1.9 km	MPC · JPL
504662	2009 AC_{40}	—	December 30, 2008	Kitt Peak	Spacewatch	KOR	1.0 km	MPC · JPL
504663	2009 AW_{45}	—	January 2, 2009	Kitt Peak	Spacewatch	·	2.0 km	MPC · JPL
504664	2009 BR_{85}	—	December 22, 2008	Kitt Peak	Spacewatch	·	1.4 km	MPC · JPL
504665	2009 BW_{106}	—	January 3, 2009	Mount Lemmon	Mount Lemmon Survey	·	710 m	MPC · JPL
504666	2009 BX_{135}	—	January 15, 2009	Kitt Peak	Spacewatch	·	690 m	MPC · JPL
504667	2009 BA_{154}	—	January 31, 2009	Kitt Peak	Spacewatch	KOR	1.3 km	MPC · JPL
504668	2009 BU_{178}	—	January 30, 2009	Mount Lemmon	Mount Lemmon Survey	·	780 m	MPC · JPL
504669	2009 BN_{184}	—	January 17, 2009	Kitt Peak	Spacewatch	TIR	3.1 km	MPC · JPL
504670	2009 BB_{190}	—	January 25, 2009	Kitt Peak	Spacewatch	·	1.8 km	MPC · JPL
504671	2009 CC_{12}	—	February 1, 2009	Kitt Peak	Spacewatch	EOS	1.6 km	MPC · JPL
504672	2009 CE_{18}	—	January 20, 2009	Mount Lemmon	Mount Lemmon Survey	·	2.6 km	MPC · JPL
504673	2009 CE_{51}	—	January 15, 2009	Kitt Peak	Spacewatch	·	2.1 km	MPC · JPL
504674	2009 CP_{52}	—	December 3, 2008	Mount Lemmon	Mount Lemmon Survey	·	1.7 km	MPC · JPL
504675	2009 DN_{3}	—	February 19, 2009	Kitt Peak	Spacewatch	·	1.0 km	MPC · JPL
504676	2009 DU_{16}	—	February 17, 2009	La Sagra	OAM	·	660 m	MPC · JPL
504677	2009 DJ_{37}	—	January 17, 2009	Kitt Peak	Spacewatch	·	590 m	MPC · JPL
504678	2009 DK_{69}	—	January 25, 2009	Kitt Peak	Spacewatch	·	3.6 km	MPC · JPL
504679	2009 DV_{104}	—	January 29, 2009	Mount Lemmon	Mount Lemmon Survey	·	2.2 km	MPC · JPL
504680	2009 EO_{2}	—	March 5, 2009	Siding Spring	SSS	APO · PHA	390 m	MPC · JPL
504681	2009 FA_{2}	—	March 17, 2009	Kitt Peak	Spacewatch	·	2.3 km	MPC · JPL
504682	2009 FQ_{6}	—	March 16, 2009	Kitt Peak	Spacewatch	EOS	2.2 km	MPC · JPL
504683	2009 FG_{26}	—	March 17, 2009	Kitt Peak	Spacewatch	·	510 m	MPC · JPL
504684	2009 FT_{35}	—	March 1, 2009	Kitt Peak	Spacewatch	EOS	1.8 km	MPC · JPL
504685	2009 FL_{40}	—	December 29, 2008	Mount Lemmon	Mount Lemmon Survey	BRA	2.0 km	MPC · JPL
504686	2009 FH_{57}	—	March 3, 2009	Kitt Peak	Spacewatch	·	2.5 km	MPC · JPL
504687	2009 FZ_{57}	—	March 18, 2009	Kitt Peak	Spacewatch	·	2.3 km	MPC · JPL
504688	2009 FT_{64}	—	March 16, 2009	Kitt Peak	Spacewatch	·	3.3 km	MPC · JPL
504689	2009 HV	—	March 18, 2009	Kitt Peak	Spacewatch	·	800 m	MPC · JPL
504690	2009 HO_{43}	—	April 20, 2009	Kitt Peak	Spacewatch	·	2.0 km	MPC · JPL
504691	2009 HV_{60}	—	March 17, 2009	Kitt Peak	Spacewatch	·	570 m	MPC · JPL
504692	2009 HN_{65}	—	April 23, 2009	Kitt Peak	Spacewatch	·	690 m	MPC · JPL
504693	2009 HT_{72}	—	April 18, 2009	Mount Lemmon	Mount Lemmon Survey	H	470 m	MPC · JPL
504694	2009 HE_{92}	—	April 29, 2009	Kitt Peak	Spacewatch	·	2.0 km	MPC · JPL
504695	2009 HR_{92}	—	April 26, 2009	Kitt Peak	Spacewatch	·	780 m	MPC · JPL
504696	2009 HE_{99}	—	April 22, 2009	Mount Lemmon	Mount Lemmon Survey	·	740 m	MPC · JPL
504697	2009 HP_{100}	—	April 30, 2009	Kitt Peak	Spacewatch	·	1.6 km	MPC · JPL
504698	2009 JF_{8}	—	May 13, 2009	Kitt Peak	Spacewatch	·	800 m	MPC · JPL
504699	2009 KF_{20}	—	May 29, 2009	Mount Lemmon	Mount Lemmon Survey	·	3.3 km	MPC · JPL
504700	2009 PK_{10}	—	June 30, 2009	Mount Lemmon	Mount Lemmon Survey	·	950 m	MPC · JPL

== 504701–504800 ==
back to top

Designation			Discovery			Properties		Ref
Permanent	Provisional	Named after	Date	Site	Discoverer(s)	Category	Diam.	Ref
504701	2009 PX_{17}	—	August 15, 2009	Kitt Peak	Spacewatch	V	620 m	MPC · JPL
504702	2009 QE_{2}	—	July 14, 2009	Kitt Peak	Spacewatch	H	510 m	MPC · JPL
504703	2009 RU_{10}	—	September 12, 2009	Kitt Peak	Spacewatch	H	540 m	MPC · JPL
504704	2009 RZ_{21}	—	September 15, 2009	Kitt Peak	Spacewatch	·	1.4 km	MPC · JPL
504705	2009 RT_{39}	—	September 15, 2009	Kitt Peak	Spacewatch	·	900 m	MPC · JPL
504706	2009 SD_{19}	—	September 22, 2009	Altschwendt	W. Ries	·	800 m	MPC · JPL
504707	2009 SH_{35}	—	September 16, 2009	Kitt Peak	Spacewatch	·	1.2 km	MPC · JPL
504708	2009 SY_{65}	—	September 17, 2009	Kitt Peak	Spacewatch	H	420 m	MPC · JPL
504709	2009 SC_{104}	—	August 20, 2009	La Sagra	OAM	MAS	770 m	MPC · JPL
504710	2009 SH_{144}	—	August 20, 2009	Kitt Peak	Spacewatch	·	1.1 km	MPC · JPL
504711	2009 SP_{171}	—	September 28, 2009	Mount Lemmon	Mount Lemmon Survey	APO	500 m	MPC · JPL
504712	2009 SO_{187}	—	September 21, 2009	Kitt Peak	Spacewatch	·	900 m	MPC · JPL
504713	2009 SH_{258}	—	September 21, 2009	Mount Lemmon	Mount Lemmon Survey	·	830 m	MPC · JPL
504714	2009 SY_{290}	—	September 25, 2009	Kitt Peak	Spacewatch	PHO	700 m	MPC · JPL
504715	2009 SG_{351}	—	September 29, 2009	Kitt Peak	Spacewatch	·	1.1 km	MPC · JPL
504716	2009 TP_{23}	—	August 27, 2009	Kitt Peak	Spacewatch	·	1.2 km	MPC · JPL
504717	2009 TE_{28}	—	October 15, 2009	La Sagra	OAM	·	2.4 km	MPC · JPL
504718	2009 TP_{49}	—	December 4, 2011	Haleakala	Pan-STARRS 1	3:2	6.0 km	MPC · JPL
504719	2009 UE_{20}	—	September 29, 2009	Mount Lemmon	Mount Lemmon Survey	·	1.2 km	MPC · JPL
504720	2009 UM_{31}	—	October 18, 2009	Mount Lemmon	Mount Lemmon Survey	·	1.5 km	MPC · JPL
504721	2009 UD_{35}	—	October 21, 2009	Mount Lemmon	Mount Lemmon Survey	·	1.9 km	MPC · JPL
504722	2009 UR_{52}	—	October 28, 2005	Mount Lemmon	Mount Lemmon Survey	·	710 m	MPC · JPL
504723	2009 UG_{55}	—	October 14, 2009	Catalina	CSS	·	1.2 km	MPC · JPL
504724	2009 UQ_{108}	—	October 23, 2009	Kitt Peak	Spacewatch	·	1.1 km	MPC · JPL
504725	2009 US_{127}	—	October 28, 2009	Bisei SG Center	BATTeRS	·	690 m	MPC · JPL
504726	2009 UR_{129}	—	October 26, 2009	Mount Lemmon	Mount Lemmon Survey	HNS	930 m	MPC · JPL
504727	2009 UG_{143}	—	October 18, 2009	Mount Lemmon	Mount Lemmon Survey	·	580 m	MPC · JPL
504728	2009 UD_{149}	—	October 24, 2009	Kitt Peak	Spacewatch	·	470 m	MPC · JPL
504729	2009 VH_{7}	—	October 18, 2009	Mount Lemmon	Mount Lemmon Survey	H	550 m	MPC · JPL
504730	2009 VO_{32}	—	November 9, 2009	Mount Lemmon	Mount Lemmon Survey	·	840 m	MPC · JPL
504731	2009 VS_{37}	—	October 22, 2009	Mount Lemmon	Mount Lemmon Survey	·	1.7 km	MPC · JPL
504732	2009 VO_{39}	—	November 10, 2009	La Sagra	OAM	·	2.9 km	MPC · JPL
504733	2009 VD_{52}	—	October 2, 2009	Mount Lemmon	Mount Lemmon Survey	H	530 m	MPC · JPL
504734	2009 VY_{68}	—	November 9, 2009	Mount Lemmon	Mount Lemmon Survey	EUN	790 m	MPC · JPL
504735	2009 VW_{69}	—	October 16, 2009	Mount Lemmon	Mount Lemmon Survey	MAR	1.0 km	MPC · JPL
504736	2009 VC_{70}	—	November 9, 2009	Mount Lemmon	Mount Lemmon Survey	·	1.1 km	MPC · JPL
504737	2009 VD_{70}	—	November 9, 2009	Mount Lemmon	Mount Lemmon Survey	·	740 m	MPC · JPL
504738	2009 VX_{73}	—	March 26, 2004	Kitt Peak	Spacewatch	3:2	4.6 km	MPC · JPL
504739	2009 VB_{74}	—	October 11, 2009	Mount Lemmon	Mount Lemmon Survey	·	710 m	MPC · JPL
504740	2009 VD_{95}	—	November 9, 2009	Kitt Peak	Spacewatch	·	920 m	MPC · JPL
504741	2009 VL_{106}	—	October 15, 2009	Catalina	CSS	BAR	1.2 km	MPC · JPL
504742	2009 VC_{107}	—	October 27, 2009	XuYi	PMO NEO Survey Program	·	1.8 km	MPC · JPL
504743	2009 VH_{113}	—	November 11, 2009	Kitt Peak	Spacewatch	·	1.4 km	MPC · JPL
504744	2009 WH_{10}	—	September 30, 2009	Mount Lemmon	Mount Lemmon Survey	·	1.5 km	MPC · JPL
504745	2009 WG_{24}	—	November 10, 2009	Kitt Peak	Spacewatch	BAR	1.4 km	MPC · JPL
504746	2009 WJ_{25}	—	November 21, 2009	Mount Lemmon	Mount Lemmon Survey	·	1.8 km	MPC · JPL
504747	2009 WU_{31}	—	November 16, 2009	Kitt Peak	Spacewatch	·	1.1 km	MPC · JPL
504748	2009 WY_{50}	—	November 20, 2009	Kitt Peak	Spacewatch	(5)	850 m	MPC · JPL
504749	2009 WE_{51}	—	December 10, 2005	Kitt Peak	Spacewatch	MAR	920 m	MPC · JPL
504750	2009 WR_{51}	—	November 11, 2009	Mount Lemmon	Mount Lemmon Survey	·	1.3 km	MPC · JPL
504751	2009 WW_{52}	—	November 20, 2009	Kitt Peak	Spacewatch	KON	1.9 km	MPC · JPL
504752	2009 WR_{64}	—	November 16, 2009	Mount Lemmon	Mount Lemmon Survey	·	760 m	MPC · JPL
504753	2009 WU_{66}	—	October 24, 2009	Mount Lemmon	Mount Lemmon Survey	H	480 m	MPC · JPL
504754	2009 WD_{69}	—	November 17, 2009	Mount Lemmon	Mount Lemmon Survey	MAR	960 m	MPC · JPL
504755	2009 WW_{71}	—	November 9, 2009	Mount Lemmon	Mount Lemmon Survey	MAR	990 m	MPC · JPL
504756	2009 WA_{75}	—	November 18, 2009	Kitt Peak	Spacewatch	·	2.7 km	MPC · JPL
504757	2009 WM_{75}	—	October 21, 2009	Mount Lemmon	Mount Lemmon Survey	·	2.2 km	MPC · JPL
504758	2009 WK_{80}	—	November 18, 2009	Kitt Peak	Spacewatch	·	1.2 km	MPC · JPL
504759	2009 WP_{80}	—	November 18, 2009	Kitt Peak	Spacewatch	EUN	1.4 km	MPC · JPL
504760	2009 WA_{89}	—	November 19, 2009	Kitt Peak	Spacewatch	·	1.1 km	MPC · JPL
504761	2009 WX_{89}	—	December 31, 2005	Kitt Peak	Spacewatch	·	1.4 km	MPC · JPL
504762	2009 WL_{92}	—	November 19, 2009	Mount Lemmon	Mount Lemmon Survey	·	1.1 km	MPC · JPL
504763	2009 WZ_{93}	—	September 28, 2009	Mount Lemmon	Mount Lemmon Survey	·	980 m	MPC · JPL
504764	2009 WN_{103}	—	November 22, 2009	Mount Lemmon	Mount Lemmon Survey	·	730 m	MPC · JPL
504765	2009 WB_{142}	—	November 18, 2009	Mount Lemmon	Mount Lemmon Survey	ADE	1.8 km	MPC · JPL
504766	2009 WQ_{152}	—	October 24, 2009	Catalina	CSS	·	1.2 km	MPC · JPL
504767	2009 WY_{155}	—	October 1, 2009	Mount Lemmon	Mount Lemmon Survey	H	560 m	MPC · JPL
504768	2009 WF_{163}	—	November 21, 2009	Kitt Peak	Spacewatch	·	790 m	MPC · JPL
504769	2009 WX_{171}	—	September 19, 2009	Mount Lemmon	Mount Lemmon Survey	·	1.2 km	MPC · JPL
504770	2009 WJ_{208}	—	November 17, 2009	Kitt Peak	Spacewatch	·	1.4 km	MPC · JPL
504771	2009 WQ_{208}	—	November 17, 2009	Kitt Peak	Spacewatch	(5)	930 m	MPC · JPL
504772	2009 WG_{212}	—	November 10, 2009	Kitt Peak	Spacewatch	·	1.1 km	MPC · JPL
504773	2009 WV_{244}	—	November 20, 2009	Kitt Peak	Spacewatch	·	1.8 km	MPC · JPL
504774	2009 WD_{252}	—	November 25, 2009	Kitt Peak	Spacewatch	HNS	1.2 km	MPC · JPL
504775	2009 WO_{263}	—	August 28, 2009	Kitt Peak	Spacewatch	HNS	1.4 km	MPC · JPL
504776	2009 XV_{7}	—	October 1, 2009	Kitt Peak	Spacewatch	H	490 m	MPC · JPL
504777	2009 XA_{16}	—	December 15, 2009	Mount Lemmon	Mount Lemmon Survey	EUN	1.1 km	MPC · JPL
504778	2009 XO_{24}	—	December 11, 2009	Mount Lemmon	Mount Lemmon Survey	·	2.2 km	MPC · JPL
504779	2009 YB_{2}	—	December 17, 2009	Mount Lemmon	Mount Lemmon Survey	·	1.7 km	MPC · JPL
504780	2009 YE_{2}	—	November 22, 2009	Mount Lemmon	Mount Lemmon Survey	·	1.2 km	MPC · JPL
504781	2009 YR_{11}	—	November 20, 2009	Mount Lemmon	Mount Lemmon Survey	·	930 m	MPC · JPL
504782	2009 YV_{11}	—	December 18, 2009	Mount Lemmon	Mount Lemmon Survey	·	1.9 km	MPC · JPL
504783	2009 YA_{14}	—	December 18, 2009	Mount Lemmon	Mount Lemmon Survey	(5)	710 m	MPC · JPL
504784	2009 YX_{23}	—	January 23, 2006	Mount Lemmon	Mount Lemmon Survey	·	1.1 km	MPC · JPL
504785	2009 YA_{25}	—	December 20, 2009	Mount Lemmon	Mount Lemmon Survey	·	2.5 km	MPC · JPL
504786	2010 AB_{6}	—	January 6, 2010	Kitt Peak	Spacewatch	·	1.1 km	MPC · JPL
504787	2010 AH_{25}	—	January 6, 2010	Kitt Peak	Spacewatch	MIS	2.1 km	MPC · JPL
504788	2010 AM_{32}	—	January 6, 2010	Kitt Peak	Spacewatch	·	1.2 km	MPC · JPL
504789	2010 AY_{33}	—	September 24, 2008	Mount Lemmon	Mount Lemmon Survey	·	1.7 km	MPC · JPL
504790	2010 AF_{61}	—	January 8, 2010	Catalina	CSS	(1547)	1.4 km	MPC · JPL
504791	2010 AM_{62}	—	December 18, 2009	Mount Lemmon	Mount Lemmon Survey	·	1.4 km	MPC · JPL
504792	2010 AO_{62}	—	November 19, 2009	Mount Lemmon	Mount Lemmon Survey	·	1.5 km	MPC · JPL
504793	2010 AF_{65}	—	September 24, 2008	Mount Lemmon	Mount Lemmon Survey	EUN	1.1 km	MPC · JPL
504794	2010 AQ_{65}	—	January 26, 2006	Mount Lemmon	Mount Lemmon Survey	·	1.0 km	MPC · JPL
504795	2010 AZ_{68}	—	January 12, 2010	Catalina	CSS	·	1.7 km	MPC · JPL
504796	2010 AH_{75}	—	January 6, 2010	Catalina	CSS	·	1.2 km	MPC · JPL
504797	2010 AN_{80}	—	January 6, 2010	Kitt Peak	Spacewatch	·	1.4 km	MPC · JPL
504798	2010 AG_{106}	—	January 20, 2009	Catalina	CSS	·	5.2 km	MPC · JPL
504799	2010 BA_{77}	—	September 10, 2001	Socorro	LINEAR	·	4.9 km	MPC · JPL
504800	2010 CO_{1}	—	February 1, 2010	WISE	WISE	APO · PHA	380 m	MPC · JPL

== 504801–504900 ==
back to top

Designation			Discovery			Properties		Ref
Permanent	Provisional	Named after	Date	Site	Discoverer(s)	Category	Diam.	Ref
504801	2010 CY_{3}	—	February 6, 2010	Mount Lemmon	Mount Lemmon Survey	·	3.9 km	MPC · JPL
504802	2010 CG_{20}	—	January 15, 2010	Kitt Peak	Spacewatch	(1547)	1.2 km	MPC · JPL
504803	2010 CO_{28}	—	February 9, 2010	Catalina	CSS	·	1.4 km	MPC · JPL
504804	2010 CT_{65}	—	February 9, 2010	Catalina	CSS	(1547)	1.3 km	MPC · JPL
504805	2010 CZ_{94}	—	February 14, 2010	Kitt Peak	Spacewatch	·	1.6 km	MPC · JPL
504806	2010 CL_{100}	—	January 11, 2010	Kitt Peak	Spacewatch	·	2.5 km	MPC · JPL
504807	2010 CD_{104}	—	February 14, 2010	Kitt Peak	Spacewatch	·	1.2 km	MPC · JPL
504808	2010 CP_{125}	—	February 15, 2010	Kitt Peak	Spacewatch	·	1.4 km	MPC · JPL
504809	2010 CZ_{160}	—	October 26, 2008	Mount Lemmon	Mount Lemmon Survey	·	1.8 km	MPC · JPL
504810	2010 CX_{182}	—	January 28, 2000	Kitt Peak	Spacewatch	·	2.4 km	MPC · JPL
504811	2010 CN_{221}	—	February 8, 2010	WISE	WISE	·	4.1 km	MPC · JPL
504812	2010 DB_{53}	—	February 22, 2010	WISE	WISE	EUP	4.1 km	MPC · JPL
504813	2010 EM_{31}	—	February 19, 2010	Kitt Peak	Spacewatch	GAL	1.7 km	MPC · JPL
504814	2010 EW_{104}	—	March 13, 2010	Catalina	CSS	·	3.2 km	MPC · JPL
504815	2010 EU_{127}	—	February 15, 2010	Catalina	CSS	·	1.6 km	MPC · JPL
504816	2010 ET_{139}	—	March 15, 2010	Mount Lemmon	Mount Lemmon Survey	·	2.1 km	MPC · JPL
504817	2010 FF_{2}	—	March 16, 2010	Mount Lemmon	Mount Lemmon Survey	·	3.6 km	MPC · JPL
504818	2010 GH_{32}	—	April 7, 2010	Mount Lemmon	Mount Lemmon Survey	T_{j} (2.97)	3.3 km	MPC · JPL
504819	2010 GL_{67}	—	April 14, 2010	Catalina	CSS	·	1.3 km	MPC · JPL
504820	2010 GW_{149}	—	April 15, 2010	WISE	WISE	T_{j} (2.98)	5.4 km	MPC · JPL
504821	2010 HS_{106}	—	March 13, 2010	Kitt Peak	Spacewatch	·	1.4 km	MPC · JPL
504822	2010 JV_{1}	—	May 3, 2010	Kitt Peak	Spacewatch	·	2.9 km	MPC · JPL
504823	2010 JO_{66}	—	October 12, 1999	Kitt Peak	Spacewatch	·	2.5 km	MPC · JPL
504824	2010 JW_{115}	—	May 13, 2010	Kitt Peak	Spacewatch	·	3.3 km	MPC · JPL
504825	2010 JK_{157}	—	May 12, 2010	Kitt Peak	Spacewatch	·	2.7 km	MPC · JPL
504826	2010 KH_{38}	—	May 17, 2010	Kitt Peak	Spacewatch	·	2.7 km	MPC · JPL
504827	2010 KZ_{117}	—	May 18, 2010	WISE	WISE	AMO	620 m	MPC · JPL
504828	2010 LL_{62}	—	March 1, 2009	Kitt Peak	Spacewatch	EUP	3.4 km	MPC · JPL
504829	2010 MR_{14}	—	December 2, 2005	Kitt Peak	Spacewatch	CYB	4.5 km	MPC · JPL
504830	2010 MU_{24}	—	June 18, 2010	WISE	WISE	·	1.8 km	MPC · JPL
504831	2010 MV_{75}	—	June 26, 2010	WISE	WISE	·	1.3 km	MPC · JPL
504832	2010 NE	—	July 3, 2010	La Sagra	OAM	·	740 m	MPC · JPL
504833	2010 NZ_{15}	—	April 8, 2006	Kitt Peak	Spacewatch	PHO	1.9 km	MPC · JPL
504834	2010 NE_{88}	—	January 16, 2010	WISE	WISE	·	4.7 km	MPC · JPL
504835	2010 OT_{25}	—	July 19, 2010	WISE	WISE	·	1.9 km	MPC · JPL
504836	2010 PO_{14}	—	February 8, 2010	WISE	WISE	·	3.5 km	MPC · JPL
504837	2010 RC_{47}	—	September 4, 2010	Kitt Peak	Spacewatch	·	620 m	MPC · JPL
504838	2010 RA_{65}	—	September 2, 2010	Mount Lemmon	Mount Lemmon Survey	·	600 m	MPC · JPL
504839	2010 RO_{68}	—	September 6, 2010	La Sagra	OAM	·	710 m	MPC · JPL
504840	2010 RB_{128}	—	October 23, 2003	Anderson Mesa	LONEOS	·	910 m	MPC · JPL
504841	2010 RM_{129}	—	September 15, 2010	Kitt Peak	Spacewatch	·	660 m	MPC · JPL
504842	2010 RE_{137}	—	September 12, 2010	WISE	WISE	·	3.5 km	MPC · JPL
504843	2010 RT_{164}	—	September 7, 2010	La Sagra	OAM	·	620 m	MPC · JPL
504844	2010 RL_{167}	—	September 7, 2010	La Sagra	OAM	PHO	780 m	MPC · JPL
504845	2010 RO_{176}	—	October 22, 2003	Kitt Peak	Spacewatch	·	460 m	MPC · JPL
504846	2010 RS_{181}	—	January 15, 2005	Kitt Peak	Spacewatch	·	710 m	MPC · JPL
504847	2010 RE_{188}	—	September 15, 2010	Haleakala	Pan-STARRS 1	cubewano (hot)	244 km	MPC · JPL
504848	2010 SG_{3}	—	October 21, 2003	Kitt Peak	Spacewatch	·	450 m	MPC · JPL
504849	2010 SA_{4}	—	September 16, 2010	Kitt Peak	Spacewatch	·	620 m	MPC · JPL
504850	2010 SC_{10}	—	September 17, 2010	Mount Lemmon	Mount Lemmon Survey	·	700 m	MPC · JPL
504851	2010 TU_{10}	—	September 4, 2010	Kitt Peak	Spacewatch	·	690 m	MPC · JPL
504852	2010 TB_{13}	—	September 15, 2010	Kitt Peak	Spacewatch	·	500 m	MPC · JPL
504853	2010 TB_{20}	—	August 6, 2010	Kitt Peak	Spacewatch	(2076)	500 m	MPC · JPL
504854	2010 TO_{46}	—	September 10, 2010	Kitt Peak	Spacewatch	·	750 m	MPC · JPL
504855	2010 TP_{100}	—	September 16, 2010	Kitt Peak	Spacewatch	·	620 m	MPC · JPL
504856	2010 TZ_{140}	—	October 11, 2010	Mount Lemmon	Mount Lemmon Survey	·	860 m	MPC · JPL
504857	2010 TY_{148}	—	September 18, 2010	Mount Lemmon	Mount Lemmon Survey	·	970 m	MPC · JPL
504858	2010 TZ_{167}	—	October 16, 2003	Kitt Peak	Spacewatch	·	560 m	MPC · JPL
504859	2010 TH_{176}	—	October 1, 2010	Catalina	CSS	·	780 m	MPC · JPL
504860	2010 UT_{12}	—	September 19, 2003	Kitt Peak	Spacewatch	·	740 m	MPC · JPL
504861	2010 UT_{14}	—	November 29, 2003	Kitt Peak	Spacewatch	·	700 m	MPC · JPL
504862	2010 UG_{33}	—	March 21, 2009	Mount Lemmon	Mount Lemmon Survey	·	830 m	MPC · JPL
504863	2010 UU_{53}	—	October 17, 2010	Mount Lemmon	Mount Lemmon Survey	·	710 m	MPC · JPL
504864	2010 UR_{56}	—	September 11, 2010	Mount Lemmon	Mount Lemmon Survey	·	830 m	MPC · JPL
504865	2010 US_{56}	—	November 29, 2003	Kitt Peak	Spacewatch	·	900 m	MPC · JPL
504866	2010 UB_{67}	—	October 12, 2010	Mount Lemmon	Mount Lemmon Survey	·	950 m	MPC · JPL
504867	2010 UD_{74}	—	October 30, 2010	Kitt Peak	Spacewatch	·	580 m	MPC · JPL
504868	2010 UU_{81}	—	July 21, 2010	WISE	WISE	·	840 m	MPC · JPL
504869	2010 VQ_{25}	—	November 1, 2010	Kitt Peak	Spacewatch	·	970 m	MPC · JPL
504870	2010 VD_{27}	—	November 26, 2003	Kitt Peak	Spacewatch	·	570 m	MPC · JPL
504871	2010 VA_{38}	—	November 3, 2010	Mount Lemmon	Mount Lemmon Survey	·	670 m	MPC · JPL
504872	2010 VY_{38}	—	November 5, 2010	La Sagra	OAM	·	670 m	MPC · JPL
504873	2010 VU_{47}	—	January 15, 2004	Kitt Peak	Spacewatch	·	690 m	MPC · JPL
504874	2010 VX_{53}	—	November 3, 2010	Mount Lemmon	Mount Lemmon Survey	·	730 m	MPC · JPL
504875	2010 VR_{78}	—	November 3, 2010	Mount Lemmon	Mount Lemmon Survey	NYS	790 m	MPC · JPL
504876	2010 VW_{85}	—	November 29, 2003	Kitt Peak	Spacewatch	·	680 m	MPC · JPL
504877	2010 VC_{89}	—	September 24, 2006	Anderson Mesa	LONEOS	·	1.4 km	MPC · JPL
504878	2010 VV_{97}	—	October 22, 2003	Kitt Peak	Spacewatch	·	670 m	MPC · JPL
504879	2010 VU_{104}	—	November 5, 2010	Kitt Peak	Spacewatch	V	500 m	MPC · JPL
504880	2010 VW_{119}	—	November 8, 2010	Kitt Peak	Spacewatch	·	860 m	MPC · JPL
504881	2010 VQ_{138}	—	September 11, 2010	Mount Lemmon	Mount Lemmon Survey	·	930 m	MPC · JPL
504882	2010 VQ_{160}	—	October 13, 2010	Mount Lemmon	Mount Lemmon Survey	V	470 m	MPC · JPL
504883	2010 VG_{170}	—	November 10, 2010	Mount Lemmon	Mount Lemmon Survey	V	390 m	MPC · JPL
504884	2010 VN_{170}	—	November 5, 2010	Kitt Peak	Spacewatch	·	790 m	MPC · JPL
504885	2010 VT_{193}	—	September 3, 2010	Mount Lemmon	Mount Lemmon Survey	·	790 m	MPC · JPL
504886	2010 VZ_{208}	—	March 7, 2008	Mount Lemmon	Mount Lemmon Survey	·	810 m	MPC · JPL
504887	2010 WL	—	November 19, 2010	Socorro	LINEAR	AMO	370 m	MPC · JPL
504888	2010 WZ_{14}	—	October 30, 2010	Kitt Peak	Spacewatch	NYS	730 m	MPC · JPL
504889	2010 WR_{31}	—	July 25, 2006	Mount Lemmon	Mount Lemmon Survey	·	830 m	MPC · JPL
504890	2010 WM_{35}	—	October 19, 2006	Kitt Peak	Deep Ecliptic Survey	·	740 m	MPC · JPL
504891	2010 WG_{45}	—	September 5, 2010	Mount Lemmon	Mount Lemmon Survey	·	700 m	MPC · JPL
504892	2010 WE_{65}	—	November 11, 2010	Kitt Peak	Spacewatch	·	1.0 km	MPC · JPL
504893	2010 XH_{21}	—	October 30, 2010	Kitt Peak	Spacewatch	·	1.0 km	MPC · JPL
504894	2010 XK_{25}	—	November 27, 2010	Catalina	CSS	PHO	1.4 km	MPC · JPL
504895	2010 XK_{26}	—	October 14, 2010	Mount Lemmon	Mount Lemmon Survey	·	810 m	MPC · JPL
504896	2010 XV_{47}	—	October 11, 2010	Catalina	CSS	·	1.1 km	MPC · JPL
504897	2010 XB_{69}	—	November 8, 2010	Mount Lemmon	Mount Lemmon Survey	·	860 m	MPC · JPL
504898	2010 XP_{74}	—	November 11, 2010	Mount Lemmon	Mount Lemmon Survey	EOS	1.8 km	MPC · JPL
504899	2011 AX_{4}	—	January 2, 2011	Mount Lemmon	Mount Lemmon Survey	·	1.1 km	MPC · JPL
504900	2011 AX_{9}	—	November 20, 2006	Kitt Peak	Spacewatch	NYS	880 m	MPC · JPL

== 504901–505000 ==
back to top

Designation			Discovery			Properties		Ref
Permanent	Provisional	Named after	Date	Site	Discoverer(s)	Category	Diam.	Ref
504901	2011 AJ_{11}	—	December 5, 1999	Kitt Peak	Spacewatch	·	1.2 km	MPC · JPL
504902	2011 AP_{11}	—	April 29, 2008	Mount Lemmon	Mount Lemmon Survey	·	860 m	MPC · JPL
504903	2011 AQ_{16}	—	November 26, 2003	Kitt Peak	Spacewatch	·	610 m	MPC · JPL
504904	2011 AV_{32}	—	October 17, 2006	Catalina	CSS	·	920 m	MPC · JPL
504905	2011 AF_{33}	—	October 11, 2009	Mount Lemmon	Mount Lemmon Survey	3:2 · SHU	4.5 km	MPC · JPL
504906	2011 AL_{42}	—	December 13, 2006	Kitt Peak	Spacewatch	·	1.1 km	MPC · JPL
504907	2011 AD_{53}	—	January 11, 2011	Kitt Peak	Spacewatch	·	1.2 km	MPC · JPL
504908	2011 AZ_{55}	—	November 15, 2006	Kitt Peak	Spacewatch	·	730 m	MPC · JPL
504909	2011 AS_{58}	—	December 5, 2010	Mount Lemmon	Mount Lemmon Survey	·	1.1 km	MPC · JPL
504910	2011 AZ_{62}	—	November 23, 2006	Kitt Peak	Spacewatch	·	970 m	MPC · JPL
504911	2011 AM_{70}	—	November 1, 2006	Kitt Peak	Spacewatch	·	760 m	MPC · JPL
504912	2011 BR_{4}	—	December 5, 2010	Mount Lemmon	Mount Lemmon Survey	MAS	680 m	MPC · JPL
504913	2011 BU_{11}	—	January 11, 2011	Catalina	CSS	·	1.4 km	MPC · JPL
504914	2011 BH_{22}	—	March 13, 2007	Catalina	CSS	·	1.6 km	MPC · JPL
504915	2011 BO_{23}	—	December 16, 2006	Kitt Peak	Spacewatch	NYS	900 m	MPC · JPL
504916	2011 BH_{29}	—	December 8, 2010	Mount Lemmon	Mount Lemmon Survey	·	820 m	MPC · JPL
504917	2011 BK_{34}	—	January 28, 2011	Kitt Peak	Spacewatch	·	1.2 km	MPC · JPL
504918	2011 BL_{36}	—	November 19, 2006	Kitt Peak	Spacewatch	·	850 m	MPC · JPL
504919	2011 BW_{52}	—	January 30, 2011	Mount Lemmon	Mount Lemmon Survey	·	1.1 km	MPC · JPL
504920	2011 BF_{74}	—	February 6, 2010	WISE	WISE	·	2.4 km	MPC · JPL
504921	2011 BO_{75}	—	March 1, 2011	Catalina	CSS	·	1.8 km	MPC · JPL
504922	2011 BN_{100}	—	February 12, 2011	Kitt Peak	Spacewatch	·	1.5 km	MPC · JPL
504923	2011 BA_{101}	—	February 12, 2011	Mount Lemmon	Mount Lemmon Survey	RAF	830 m	MPC · JPL
504924	2011 BN_{107}	—	February 10, 2011	Mount Lemmon	Mount Lemmon Survey	·	1.5 km	MPC · JPL
504925	2011 BU_{123}	—	December 10, 2010	Mount Lemmon	Mount Lemmon Survey	·	1.6 km	MPC · JPL
504926	2011 BT_{133}	—	January 3, 2011	Mount Lemmon	Mount Lemmon Survey	NYS	760 m	MPC · JPL
504927	2011 BE_{154}	—	January 10, 2011	Kitt Peak	Spacewatch	·	820 m	MPC · JPL
504928	2011 CO_{2}	—	February 1, 2011	Haleakala	Pan-STARRS 1	AMO	740 m	MPC · JPL
504929	2011 CB_{5}	—	January 26, 2006	Mount Lemmon	Mount Lemmon Survey	H	470 m	MPC · JPL
504930	2011 CC_{18}	—	December 10, 2010	Mount Lemmon	Mount Lemmon Survey	MAS	610 m	MPC · JPL
504931	2011 CB_{30}	—	January 26, 2011	Mount Lemmon	Mount Lemmon Survey	·	1.1 km	MPC · JPL
504932	2011 CK_{35}	—	February 4, 2011	Catalina	CSS	·	1.1 km	MPC · JPL
504933	2011 CW_{35}	—	February 25, 2007	Mount Lemmon	Mount Lemmon Survey	·	1.3 km	MPC · JPL
504934	2011 CQ_{45}	—	December 22, 2006	Kitt Peak	Spacewatch	·	880 m	MPC · JPL
504935	2011 CF_{54}	—	January 15, 2011	Mount Lemmon	Mount Lemmon Survey	MAS	510 m	MPC · JPL
504936	2011 CT_{57}	—	August 30, 2008	Socorro	LINEAR	·	1.9 km	MPC · JPL
504937	2011 CU_{74}	—	January 26, 2011	Kitt Peak	Spacewatch	ERI	1.4 km	MPC · JPL
504938	2011 CC_{78}	—	February 11, 2011	Catalina	CSS	·	2.4 km	MPC · JPL
504939	2011 CH_{79}	—	December 24, 2006	Kitt Peak	Spacewatch	·	910 m	MPC · JPL
504940	2011 CU_{83}	—	January 27, 2011	Kitt Peak	Spacewatch	·	1.1 km	MPC · JPL
504941	2011 CG_{87}	—	January 21, 2006	Mount Lemmon	Mount Lemmon Survey	H	370 m	MPC · JPL
504942	2011 DK_{3}	—	February 4, 2011	Catalina	CSS	PHO	1.0 km	MPC · JPL
504943	2011 DP_{3}	—	February 27, 2006	Mount Lemmon	Mount Lemmon Survey	H	330 m	MPC · JPL
504944	2011 DV_{11}	—	February 8, 2011	Mount Lemmon	Mount Lemmon Survey	MAR	900 m	MPC · JPL
504945	2011 DM_{22}	—	February 26, 2011	Kitt Peak	Spacewatch	H	400 m	MPC · JPL
504946	2011 DV_{30}	—	February 8, 2011	Mount Lemmon	Mount Lemmon Survey	MAS	690 m	MPC · JPL
504947	2011 DL_{38}	—	March 26, 2007	Mount Lemmon	Mount Lemmon Survey	·	1.3 km	MPC · JPL
504948	2011 EO_{33}	—	February 25, 2011	Kitt Peak	Spacewatch	·	2.2 km	MPC · JPL
504949	2011 EK_{62}	—	March 12, 2011	Mount Lemmon	Mount Lemmon Survey	·	2.8 km	MPC · JPL
504950	2011 ED_{66}	—	February 8, 2011	Mount Lemmon	Mount Lemmon Survey	·	1.4 km	MPC · JPL
504951	2011 EC_{84}	—	December 14, 2010	Mount Lemmon	Mount Lemmon Survey	MAS	760 m	MPC · JPL
504952	2011 FA_{5}	—	March 9, 2007	Kitt Peak	Spacewatch	EUN	1.1 km	MPC · JPL
504953	2011 FO_{15}	—	March 28, 2011	Mount Lemmon	Mount Lemmon Survey	·	1.4 km	MPC · JPL
504954	2011 FV_{41}	—	April 30, 2003	Kitt Peak	Spacewatch	·	1.7 km	MPC · JPL
504955	2011 FB_{43}	—	June 10, 2007	Kitt Peak	Spacewatch	·	1.5 km	MPC · JPL
504956	2011 FA_{59}	—	March 30, 2011	Mount Lemmon	Mount Lemmon Survey	·	950 m	MPC · JPL
504957	2011 FK_{61}	—	September 23, 2004	Kitt Peak	Spacewatch	·	1.3 km	MPC · JPL
504958	2011 FN_{87}	—	April 1, 2011	Mount Lemmon	Mount Lemmon Survey	H	500 m	MPC · JPL
504959	2011 FX_{87}	—	March 26, 2007	Mount Lemmon	Mount Lemmon Survey	·	1.7 km	MPC · JPL
504960	2011 FH_{102}	—	October 29, 2005	Mount Lemmon	Mount Lemmon Survey	KON	2.1 km	MPC · JPL
504961	2011 FQ_{103}	—	March 6, 2011	Mount Lemmon	Mount Lemmon Survey	·	1.3 km	MPC · JPL
504962	2011 FJ_{111}	—	March 11, 2011	Kitt Peak	Spacewatch	MAR	950 m	MPC · JPL
504963	2011 FG_{125}	—	November 4, 1996	Kitt Peak	Spacewatch	·	1.6 km	MPC · JPL
504964	2011 FQ_{138}	—	November 18, 2009	Kitt Peak	Spacewatch	·	970 m	MPC · JPL
504965	2011 FW_{143}	—	September 12, 2005	Kitt Peak	Spacewatch	·	1.3 km	MPC · JPL
504966	2011 FS_{152}	—	October 17, 2001	Socorro	LINEAR	H	460 m	MPC · JPL
504967	2011 FS_{156}	—	September 28, 2009	Mount Lemmon	Mount Lemmon Survey	·	1.2 km	MPC · JPL
504968	2011 GY_{3}	—	March 25, 2011	Kitt Peak	Spacewatch	H	390 m	MPC · JPL
504969	2011 GD_{17}	—	April 1, 2011	Mount Lemmon	Mount Lemmon Survey	·	1.1 km	MPC · JPL
504970	2011 GB_{31}	—	March 24, 2011	Kitt Peak	Spacewatch	·	1.3 km	MPC · JPL
504971	2011 GP_{32}	—	April 1, 2011	Kitt Peak	Spacewatch	EUN	1.1 km	MPC · JPL
504972	2011 GG_{36}	—	May 10, 2007	Kitt Peak	Spacewatch	·	1.4 km	MPC · JPL
504973	2011 GA_{46}	—	March 2, 2011	Kitt Peak	Spacewatch	MAR	1.2 km	MPC · JPL
504974	2011 GQ_{63}	—	November 8, 2008	Kitt Peak	Spacewatch	·	2.8 km	MPC · JPL
504975	2011 GF_{68}	—	April 15, 2011	Haleakala	Pan-STARRS 1	H	620 m	MPC · JPL
504976	2011 GA_{69}	—	March 5, 2008	Mount Lemmon	Mount Lemmon Survey	H	480 m	MPC · JPL
504977	2011 GF_{77}	—	March 1, 2011	Mount Lemmon	Mount Lemmon Survey	·	1.6 km	MPC · JPL
504978	2011 GN_{80}	—	March 26, 2011	Kitt Peak	Spacewatch	·	1.8 km	MPC · JPL
504979	2011 HM	—	April 12, 2011	Mount Lemmon	Mount Lemmon Survey	H	480 m	MPC · JPL
504980	2011 HO_{9}	—	April 6, 2011	Mount Lemmon	Mount Lemmon Survey	·	1.9 km	MPC · JPL
504981	2011 HD_{13}	—	March 27, 2011	Kitt Peak	Spacewatch	·	2.1 km	MPC · JPL
504982	2011 HN_{18}	—	April 6, 2011	Mount Lemmon	Mount Lemmon Survey	·	1.3 km	MPC · JPL
504983	2011 HS_{28}	—	April 13, 2011	Catalina	CSS	H	520 m	MPC · JPL
504984	2011 HC_{32}	—	January 11, 2010	Kitt Peak	Spacewatch	EUN	1.2 km	MPC · JPL
504985	2011 HT_{33}	—	April 6, 2011	Kitt Peak	Spacewatch	·	1.6 km	MPC · JPL
504986	2011 HE_{39}	—	April 26, 2011	Kitt Peak	Spacewatch	·	2.4 km	MPC · JPL
504987	2011 HZ_{50}	—	April 28, 2011	Haleakala	Pan-STARRS 1	·	1.1 km	MPC · JPL
504988	2011 HD_{59}	—	April 28, 2011	Haleakala	Pan-STARRS 1	·	1.7 km	MPC · JPL
504989	2011 HT_{59}	—	April 28, 2011	Haleakala	Pan-STARRS 1	EUN	1.4 km	MPC · JPL
504990	2011 HV_{59}	—	April 28, 2011	Haleakala	Pan-STARRS 1	·	1.9 km	MPC · JPL
504991	2011 HY_{62}	—	August 12, 2007	Siding Spring	SSS	·	2.5 km	MPC · JPL
504992	2011 HC_{78}	—	November 16, 2009	Mount Lemmon	Mount Lemmon Survey	·	1.1 km	MPC · JPL
504993	2011 HT_{100}	—	April 28, 2011	Haleakala	Pan-STARRS 1	·	2.4 km	MPC · JPL
504994	2011 JU_{2}	—	May 3, 2011	Mount Lemmon	Mount Lemmon Survey	AMO +1km	1.5 km	MPC · JPL
504995	2011 JS_{14}	—	April 28, 2011	Kitt Peak	Spacewatch	·	2.1 km	MPC · JPL
504996	2011 JE_{22}	—	November 2, 2008	Mount Lemmon	Mount Lemmon Survey	·	1.9 km	MPC · JPL
504997	2011 JQ_{31}	—	July 15, 2007	La Sagra	OAM	JUN	1.2 km	MPC · JPL
504998	2011 KU_{2}	—	February 12, 2011	Mount Lemmon	Mount Lemmon Survey	·	1.6 km	MPC · JPL
504999	2011 KS_{9}	—	May 21, 2011	Mount Lemmon	Mount Lemmon Survey	·	2.3 km	MPC · JPL
505000	2011 KU_{10}	—	April 19, 2006	Kitt Peak	Spacewatch	·	2.3 km	MPC · JPL

back to top
