= List of stars in Mensa =

This is the list of notable stars in the constellation Mensa, sorted by decreasing brightness.

Name	B	Var	HD	HIP	RA	Dec	vis. mag.	abs. mag.	Dist. (ly)	Sp. class	Notes
α Men	α		43834	29271	06^{h} 10^{m} 14.20^{s}	−74° 45′ 09.1″	5.08	5.05	33	G5V	Hoerikwaggo
γ Men	γ		37763	25918	05^{h} 31^{m} 52.66^{s}	−76° 20′ 30.0″	5.18	2.73	101	K4III	double star
β Men	β		33285	23467	05^{h} 02^{m} 43.00^{s}	−71° 18′ 51.6″	5.30	−1.17	642	G8III	
θ Men	θ		54239	33384	06^{h} 56^{m} 34.48^{s}	−79° 25′ 12.7″	5.45	0.26	356	B9.5/A0III/IV	
κ Men	κ		40953	27566	05^{h} 50^{m} 16.80^{s}	−79° 21′ 41.5″	5.46	0.87	270	B9V	
η Men	η		32440	22871	04^{h} 55^{m} 11.14^{s}	−74° 56′ 13.2″	5.47	−1.23	712	K6III	suspected variable
μ Men	μ		30612	21949	04^{h} 43^{m} 03.95^{s}	−70° 55′ 52.0″	5.53	−0.32	483	B9IV	
ε Men	ε		60816	36039	07^{h} 25^{m} 38.19^{s}	−79° 05′ 39.1″	5.54	−0.24	466	K2/K3III	
ζ Men	ζ		50506	31897	06^{h} 40^{m} 02.91^{s}	−80° 48′ 49.4″	5.61	0.14	404	A5III	
π Men	π		39091	26394	05^{h} 37^{m} 08.79^{s}	−80° 28′ 18.0″	5.65	4.35	59	G3IV	has two planet (b & c)
δ Men	δ		28525	20049	04^{h} 17^{m} 59.18^{s}	−80° 12′ 51.1″	5.67	0.19	408	K2/K3III+..	double star
HD 22676			22676	16290	03^{h} 29^{m} 58.93^{s}	−78° 21′ 06.4″	5.68	0.81	307	G8III	
ν Men	ν		29116	20297	04^{h} 20^{m} 58.03^{s}	−81° 34′ 48.8″	5.78	2.13	175	F0/F2III	
WX Men		WX	37993	26169	05^{h} 34^{m} 44.78^{s}	−73° 44′ 28.9″	5.79	−1.74	1045	M2/M3III	semiregular variable, ΔV = 0.15^{m}
ξ Men	ξ		34172	23148	04^{h} 58^{m} 50.99^{s}	−82° 28′ 13.9″	5.84	0.69	349	G8III	variable star, ΔV = 0.005^{m}, P = 148.14815 d
ι Men	ι		38602	26264	05^{h} 35^{m} 36.13^{s}	−78° 49′ 15.2″	6.04	−0.90	795	B8III	rotating ellipsoidal variable, V_{max} = 6.00^{m}, V_{min} = 6.05^{m}, P = 5.288 d
HD 30479			30479	21611	04^{h} 38^{m} 21.74^{s}	−77° 39′ 21.5″	6.05	−0.46	655	K2III	
TZ Men		TZ	39780	25776	05^{h} 30^{m} 13.93^{s}	−84° 47′ 06.8″	6.18	1.03	349	A1III + B9V:	Algol variable, V_{max} = 6.19^{m}, V_{min} = 6.87^{m}, P = 8.56898 d
HD 33875			33875	23737	05^{h} 06^{m} 09.26^{s}	−73° 02′ 16.2″	6.26	0.69	423	A0V	
HD 31975			31975	22717	04^{h} 53^{m} 05.73^{s}	−72° 24′ 30.0″	6.28	3.72	106	F8V	
HD 23474			23474	16827	03^{h} 36^{m} 30.18^{s}	−78° 19′ 23.1″	6.29	−0.65	795	K2III	
HD 33519			33519	23251	05^{h} 00^{m} 13.29^{s}	−78° 18′ 00.0″	6.29	−1.30	1072	K5/M0III	optical double
HD 35184			35184	24507	05^{h} 15^{m} 24.88^{s}	−73° 35′ 18.6″	6.49	1.28	359	A6V	
λ Men	λ		39810	27369	05^{h} 47^{m} 48.15^{s}	−72° 42′ 08.3″	6.54	1.17	386	K0III	
HD 38283			38283	26380	05^{h} 37^{m} 02^{s}	−73° 41′ 58″	6.70		123	F9.5V	Bubup, has a planet (b)
YY Men		YY	32918	23106	04^{h} 58^{m} 17.94^{s}	−75° 16′ 38.0″	8.05		942	K2III	FK Com Variable, V_{max} = 7.91^{m}, V_{min} = 8.40^{m}, P = 9.603 d
HD 39194			39194	27080	05^{h} 44^{m} 32^{s}	−70° 08′ 37″	8.08		84	K0V	has three planets (b, c and d)
UX Men		UX	37513	25760	05^{h} 30^{m} 03.18^{s}	−76° 14′ 55.4″	8.24		332	F8V	Algol variable, ΔV = 0.380^{m}, P = 8.287 d
TY Men		TY	37909	25472	05^{h} 26^{m} 49.73^{s}	−81° 35′ 07.2″	8.26		569	A3/A4V	W UMa Variable, V_{max} = 8.08^{m}, V_{min} = 8.56^{m}, P = 0.46166701 d
HD 42936			42936	28941	06^{h} 06^{m} 30.0^{s}	−72° 30′ 46″	9.1		159	K0IV	has a planet (b)
AO Men		AO	45081	29964	06^{h} 18^{m} 28.22^{s}	−72° 02′ 42.1″	9.95	7.02	126	K3:V:	BY Draconis variable V_{max} = 9.96^{m}, V_{min} = 10.18^{m}
R71			269006	23428	05^{h} 02^{m} 07.39^{s}	−71° 20′ 13.11″	10.55		160000	OB	in LMC, luminous blue variable
HDE 268835			268835	22989	04^{h} 56^{m} 47.08^{s}	−69° 50′ 24.79″	10.66		160000	B8Ie	in LMC; blue hypergiant
TU Men		TU			04^{h} 41^{m} 40.70^{s}	−76° 36′ 45.8″	11.6				SU UMa Variable, V_{max} = 11.6^{m}, V_{min} = 18.5^{m}, P = 0.1172 d
HV 2257					04^{h} 58^{m} 10.80^{s}	−69° 56′ 59.0″	12.50		160000	K5-M3	in LMC, Cepheid variable
AH Men		AH			06^{h} 11^{m} 43.95^{s}	−81° 49′ 22.7″	13.15				Nova-like star, V_{max} = 13.15^{m}, V_{min} = 13.9^{m}, P = 0.12721 d
W Men		W			05^{h} 26^{m} 24.52^{s}	−71° 11′ 11.8″	13.8		160000	F8:Iab:p	in LMC; R CrB variable
RX J0513.9-6952					05^{h} 13^{m} 50.81^{s}	−69° 51′ 46.7″	17		160000	Ss	in LMC, X-ray binary
LMC X-2					05^{h} 20^{m} 28.04^{s}	−71° 57′ 53.3″	18.0		160000		in LMC, Low-mass X-ray binary
MACHO-LMC-5					05^{h} 16^{m} 41.1^{s}	−70° 29′ 18″	21.15		160000		microlensing event; source in LMC lensed by red dwarf
CAL-87					05^{h} 46^{m} 46.39^{s}	−71° 08′ 53.9″			160000		in LMC, X-ray binary

== See also ==
- List of stars by constellation
