= HD 175167 =

Star in the constellation Pavo

Observation data Epoch J2000.0 Equinox ICRS
- Constellation: Pavo
- Right ascension: 19^{h} 00^{m} 00.83509^{s}
- Declination: −69° 56′ 39.2647″
- Apparent magnitude (V): 8.01

Characteristics
- Evolutionary stage: subgiant
- Spectral type: G5IV/V
- Apparent magnitude (B): 8.761
- Apparent magnitude (J): 6.713±0.019
- Apparent magnitude (H): 6.381±0.018
- Apparent magnitude (K): 6.288±0.018
- B−V color index: 0.751±0.002

Astrometry
Radial velocity (R_{v})	4.58±0.12 km/s
Proper motion (μ)	RA: -7.234 mas/yr Dec.: -191.895 mas/yr
Parallax (π)	14.0421±0.0229 mas
Distance	232.3 ± 0.4 ly (71.2 ± 0.1 pc)
Absolute magnitude (M_{V})	3.88

Details
Mass	1.17±0.09 M_{☉}
Radius	1.75±0.04 R_{☉}
Luminosity	2.857 L_{☉}
Surface gravity (log g)	4.09±0.09 cgs
Temperature	5,635±28 K
Metallicity [Fe/H]	+0.28±0.02 dex
Rotational velocity (v sin i)	2.6 km/s

Other designations
- CD−70°1658, HD 175167, HIP 93281, PPM 363703, LTT 7516, NLTT 47212

Database references
SIMBAD	data
Exoplanet Archive	data

HD 175167 is a star with an exoplanet companion in the southern constellation of Pavo. It is too faint to be visible with the naked eye at an apparent visual magnitude of 8.01. The star is located at a distance of 232 light-years based on parallax measurements, and it is drifting further away with a radial velocity of 5 km/s. It shows a high proper motion, traversing the celestial sphere at an angular rate of 0.190 arcsec yr^{−1}.

This yellow-hued star has a stellar classification of G5IV/V, which, together with the star's absolute magnitude of 3.88, is consistent with a star that is in the early stages of evolving off the main sequence. It has a high metallicity and is spinning with a projected rotational velocity of 2.6 km/s. The star has 1.2 times the mass of the Sun and 1.75 times the Sun's girth. It is radiating 2.9 times the Sun's luminosity from its photosphere at an effective temperature of 5,635 K.

== Planetary system ==
A Jovian planetary companion was discovered in 2010 by a team of the Magellan Planet Search Program, led by Pamela Arriagada. Designated HD 175167 b, their Doppler velocity data (taken over a five year period) indicates the planet has an orbital period of 3.5 years at a distance of 2.40 AU (359 Gm) from the host star with an eccentricity (ovalness) of 0.54. Since the inclination of the orbital plane was initially unknown, it was only possible to deduce a lower bound on the planet's mass. It is at least 7.8 times as massive as Jupiter. In a 2013 paper, Robert A. Wittenmyer and colleagues reviewed the data of this and many other systems with one or two planets for possible additional planets, but were unable to find any evidence of any.

An astrometric measurement of the planet's inclination and true mass was published in 2022 as part of Gaia DR3. A number of subsequent studies in 2022 and 2023 have determined astrometric orbits for HD 175167 b, estimating masses ranging from 6.4 M_{J} to 15 M_{J}, the latter of which would put it at the borderline of being a brown dwarf. The most recent and accurate mass measurement is 10 M_{J}, making it a massive super-Jovian planet.

The HD 175167 planetary system
Companion (in order from star)	Mass	Semimajor axis (AU)	Orbital period (days)	Eccentricity	Inclination (°)	Radius
b	10.2±0.4 M_{J}	2.44±0.07	1275.8±0.4	0.529±0.002	38.6±1.7	—

== See also ==
- HD 129445
- HD 152079
- HD 164604
- HD 86226
- List of extrasolar planets
