= HD 164604 b =

Extrasolar planet in the constellation Sagittarius

HD 164604 b / Caleuche
Discovery
- Discovered by: Arriagada et al.
- Discovery site: Las Campanas Observatory
- Discovery date: January 26, 2010
- Detection method: Doppler spectroscopy

Orbital characteristics
- Apastron: 1.40 AU (209,000,000 km)
- Periastron: 0.85 AU (127,000,000 km)
- Semi-major axis: 1.13 ± 0.05 AU (169,000,000 ± 7,500,000 km)
- Eccentricity: 0.24 ± 0.14
- Orbital period (sidereal): 606.4 ± 9.0 d 1.66 y
- Average orbital speed: 20.3
- Inclination: 29°±19°
- Time of periastron: 24552674 ± 80
- Argument of periastron: 51 ± 23
- Semi-amplitude: 77 ± 32
- Star: HD 164604

Physical characteristics
- Mass: 14.3±5.5 M_{J}

HD 164604 b is an extrasolar planet discovered in January 2010 in association with the Magellan Planet Search Program. It has a minimum mass 2.7 times the mass of Jupiter and an orbital period of 606.4 days. Its star is classified as a K2 V dwarf and is roughly 124 light-years away from Earth.

HD 164604 b is named Caleuche. The name was selected in the NameExoWorlds campaign by Chile, during the 100th anniversary of the International Astronomical Union (IAU). Caleuche is a large ghost ship from southern Chilote mythology which sails the seas around the island of Chiloé at night.

An astrometric measurement of the planet's inclination and true mass was published in 2022 as part of Gaia DR3.

== See also ==
- HD 129445 b
- HD 152079 b
- HD 175167 b
- HD 86226 b
