= HD 175167 b =

Extrasolar planet in the constellation Pavo

Discovery
- Discovered by: Arriagada et al.
- Discovery site: Las Campanas Observatory
- Discovery date: January 26, 2010
- Detection method: Doppler spectroscopy

Orbital characteristics
- Semi-major axis: 2.438+0.064 −0.071 AU
- Eccentricity: 0.529±0.002
- Orbital period (sidereal): 1275.8±0.4 d 3.493±0.001 y
- Average orbital speed: 20.3
- Inclination: 38.6°±1.7°
- Time of periastron: 2456171+16 −21
- Argument of periastron: 343.4°+5.2° −4.2°
- Semi-amplitude: 148.3±4.1 m/s
- Star: HD 175167

Physical characteristics
- Mass: 10.2±0.4 M_{J}

HD 175167 b is an exoplanet orbiting HD 175167, which is a G type star within the constellation Pavo 232 light-years away from the Earth. The planet was discovered by the Magellan Planet Search Program as the astronomical object fit the Keplerian orbital model. During the observations 13 doppler velocity tests were conducted, which showed this object's mass was at least 7.8 Jovian-masses and its orbit has a high eccentricity. The exoplanet takes 3.53 years to complete a full stellar orbit.

An astrometric measurement of the planet's inclination and true mass was published in 2022 as part of Gaia DR3. A number of subsequent studies in 2022 and 2023 have determined astrometric orbits for HD 175167 b, estimating masses ranging from 6.4 M_{J} to 15 M_{J}, the latter of which would put it at the borderline of being a brown dwarf. The most recent and accurate mass measurement is 10 M_{J}, making it a massive super-Jovian planet.

== See also ==
- HD 129445 b
- HD 152079 b
- HD 164604 b
- HD 86226 b
