= HD 129445 =

Star in the constellation Circinus

Observation data Epoch J2000.0 Equinox ICRS
- Constellation: Circinus
- Right ascension: 14^{h} 46^{m} 03.06521^{s}
- Declination: −68° 45′ 45.8797″
- Apparent magnitude (V): 8.80

Characteristics
- Spectral type: G6 V
- Apparent magnitude (B): 9.556
- Apparent magnitude (J): 7.531±0.023
- Apparent magnitude (H): 7.243±0.027
- Apparent magnitude (K): 7.167±0.026
- B−V color index: 0.756±0.002

Astrometry
Radial velocity (R_{v})	+8.56±0.13 km/s
Proper motion (μ)	RA: −197.892 mas/yr Dec.: −57.069 mas/yr
Parallax (π)	14.9136±0.0147 mas
Distance	218.7 ± 0.2 ly (67.05 ± 0.07 pc)
Absolute magnitude (M_{V})	4.73

Details
Mass	1.06+0.03 −0.05 M_{☉}
Radius	1.18±0.01 R_{☉}
Luminosity	1.229+0.005 −0.004 L_{☉}
Surface gravity (log g)	4.39±0.08 cgs
Temperature	5,605+21 −34 K
Metallicity [Fe/H]	0.36±0.10 dex
Rotational velocity (v sin i)	1.4 km/s
Age	4.94+3.77 −2.04 Gyr

Other designations
- CD−68°1403, HD 129445, HIP 72203, PPM 360965, LTT 5856, NLTT 38236

Database references
SIMBAD	data
Exoplanet Archive	data

HD 129445 (HIP 72203; LTT 5856) is a star located in the southern constellation Circinus. It has an apparent magnitude of 8.80, making it faintly visible in binoculars but not to the naked eye. The object is located relatively close at a distance of 219 light-years based on Gaia DR3 parallax measurements but it is drifting away with a spectroscopic radial velocity of 8.56 km/s. It has an absolute magnitude of +4.73, which is similar to the Sun's absolute magnitude of 4.83.

== Physical characteristics ==
HD 129445 has a stellar classification of G6 V, indicating that it is an ordinary G-type main-sequence star like the Sun, albeit a bit cooler. It has 106% the mass of the Sun and 118% the radius of the Sun. It radiates 1.23 times the luminosity of the Sun from its photosphere at an effective temperature of 5,605 K, giving it a yellow hue when viewed in the night sky. HD 129445 is extremely metal enriched with an iron abundance more than twice of that of the Sun's and it spins slowly with a projected rotational velocity of 1.4 km/s. It is slightly older than the Sun at the age of 4.94 billion years.

== Planetary system ==
The star was observed by the Magellan Planet Search Program due to its absolute visual magnitude and high metallicity. The Magellan program conducted 17 doppler velocity measurements, which spans a full orbital period. The results led the program to detect a planet dubbed HD 129445 b. In 2023, the inclination and true mass of HD 129445 b were determined via astrometry.

The HD 129445 planetary system
Companion (in order from star)	Mass	Semimajor axis (AU)	Orbital period (years)	Eccentricity	Inclination (°)	Radius
b	2.51+1.1 −0.54 M_{J}	2.984+0.039 −0.054	4.933+0.093 −0.13	0.572+0.087 −0.086	52+24 −19 or 128+19 −24	—

== See also ==
- HD 152079
- HD 164604
- HD 175167
- HD 86226
- List of extrasolar planets
