= HD 70642 =

Star in the constellation Puppis

Observation data Epoch J2000 Equinox ICRS
- Constellation: Puppis
- Right ascension: 08^{h} 21^{m} 28.13685^{s}
- Declination: −39° 42′ 19.4843″
- Apparent magnitude (V): +7.17

Characteristics
- Spectral type: G6V CN+0.5
- B−V color index: 0.692±0.022

Astrometry
Radial velocity (R_{v})	+49.31±0.12 km/s
Proper motion (μ)	RA: −201.729 mas/yr Dec.: 225.102 mas/yr
Parallax (π)	34.1478±0.0154 mas
Distance	95.51 ± 0.04 ly (29.28 ± 0.01 pc)
Absolute magnitude (M_{V})	+4.93

Details
Mass	1.04±0.02 M_{☉}
Radius	0.97±0.01 R_{☉}
Luminosity	0.917±0.004 L_{☉}
Surface gravity (log g)	4.47±0.02 cgs
Temperature	5732±23 K
Metallicity [Fe/H]	+0.17±0.04 dex
Rotational velocity (v sin i)	1.57 km/s
Age	1.9±1.1 Gyr; 3.8±2.6 Gyr

Other designations
- CD−39°4247, GJ 304, HD 70642, HIP 40952, SAO 199126, LTT 3116

Database references
SIMBAD	data
Exoplanet Archive	data
ARICNS	data

HD 70642 is a star with an exoplanetary companion in the southern constellation of Puppis. It has an apparent visual magnitude of +7.17, which is too dim to be readily visible to the naked eye. The system is located at a distance of 95.5 light-years (29.3 parsecs) from the Sun based on parallax measurements, and is drifting further away with a radial velocity of +49.3 km/s. It came to within 55.3 ly of the Solar System some 329,000 years ago.

This may be considered to be a solar analog star, being similar in physical properties to the Sun. It is a G-type main-sequence star with a stellar classification of G6V CN+0.5. It is comparable to the age of the Sun, estimated to be in the range of 2–6 billion years old. Although chromospherically inactive a magnetic field has been detected. This star has about the same mass and radius as the Sun, is slightly cooler and less luminous, and is richer in abundance of iron relative to hydrogen. It is spinning at a leisurely rate, showing a projected rotational velocity of 1.6 km/s.

== Planetary system ==
A long period planetary companion to HD 70642 was announced in 2003. This planet orbits in a circular orbit (e=0.034) at 3.232 AU. HD 70642 itself is similar enough to the sun that its habitable zone is at around the same distance(0.9-1.3 AU). HD 70642 b is thought to be compatible with potential Earth-mass planets at 1 AU. Because of this the HD 70642 system may be similar in structure to our own. In 2023, the inclination and true mass of HD 70642 b were determined via astrometry.

The HD 70642 planetary system
Companion (in order from star)	Mass	Semimajor axis (AU)	Orbital period (years)	Eccentricity	Inclination (°)	Radius
b	3.9+0.29 −0.27 M_{J}	3.295±0.021	5.751+0.038 −0.035	0.04+0.034 −0.027	29.9+2.6 −2.4 or 150.1+2.4 −2.6	—

== See also ==
- Gliese 777
- HD 28185
- Pi Mensae
- HIP 11915
- Lists of exoplanets
