= HD 86226 =

Star in the constellation Hydra

Observation data Epoch J2000.0 Equinox ICRS
- Constellation: Hydra
- Right ascension: 09^{h} 56^{m} 29.844^{s}
- Declination: −24° 05′ 57.80″
- Apparent magnitude (V): 7.93

Characteristics
- Evolutionary stage: main sequence
- Spectral type: G2V
- Apparent magnitude (B): 8.577
- Apparent magnitude (R): 7.71
- Apparent magnitude (J): 6.839±0.019
- Apparent magnitude (H): 6.577±0.034
- Apparent magnitude (K): 6.463±0.023
- B−V color index: 0.647±0.014
- V−R color index: 0.22

Astrometry
Radial velocity (R_{v})	+19.56±0.19 km/s
Proper motion (μ)	RA: −177.127 mas/yr Dec.: +47.099 mas/yr
Parallax (π)	21.9301±0.0267 mas
Distance	148.7 ± 0.2 ly (45.60 ± 0.06 pc)
Absolute magnitude (M_{V})	4.66

Details
Mass	1.08±0.05 M_{☉}
Radius	1.03±0.02 R_{☉}
Luminosity	1.24+0.09 −0.07 L_{☉}
Surface gravity (log g)	4.41±0.02 cgs
Temperature	6,007+75 −71 K
Metallicity [Fe/H]	−0.015±0.041 dex
Rotation	22.8±3.0 days
Rotational velocity (v sin i)	3.6 km/s
Age	3.8±1.8 Gyr

Other designations
- CD−23°8866, HD 86226, HIP 48739, SAO 178205, PPM 256971

Database references
SIMBAD	data
Exoplanet Archive	data

HD 86226 is a star with a pair of orbiting exoplanet companions, found in the constellation of Hydra. With an apparent visual magnitude of 7.93, it is too dim to be visible with the naked eye. The distance to this system has been determined by the parallax method, yielding a range of 149 light years. It is receding with a heliocentric radial velocity of +19.6 km/s. A survey in 2015 has ruled out the existence of any stellar companions at projected distances above 12 astronomical units.

== Description ==
This is an ordinary G-type main-sequence star with a stellar classification of G2V. It is similar in size, mass, and composition to the Sun, although it is not considered a solar twin. The age is about 3.8 billion years old. The star is radiating 18% greater luminosity (compared to the Sun) from its photosphere at an effective temperature of 5,863 K. It is spinning with a projected rotational velocity of 3.6 km/s.

As of 2014, Radio emission at a frequency of 150 MHz has been tentatively detected from the proximity of this system, although it is not clear whether the star or a satellite orbiting a rapidly rotating planet is the source.

== Planetary system ==
Due to the periodic spectrum shifts when it had when placed under a Doppler test, 13 Magellan Doppler Velocity observations were made of an object found near the star. The object discovered in 2010 had a Keplerian orbit, was declared an exoplanet and dubbed HD 86226 b. A hot Super-Earth planet called HD 86226 c was discovered in 2020. It may be undergoing considerable atmospheric mass loss.

The HD 86226 planetary system
Companion (in order from star)	Mass	Semimajor axis (AU)	Orbital period (days)	Eccentricity	Inclination (°)	Radius
c	7.25+1.19 −1.12 M_{🜨}	0.049±0.001	3.984436±0.000217	0.06±0.08	86.45+0.26 −0.16	2.16±0.08 R_{🜨}
b	0.46±0.04 M_{J}	2.73±0.06	1,609.5±19.4	0.04±0.07	—	—

== See also ==
- HD 129445
- HD 152079
- HD 164604
- HD 175167
- List of exoplanets discovered in 2010 - HD 86226 b
- List of exoplanets discovered in 2020 - HD 86226 c
