= HD 159868 b =

Extrasolar jovian planet that orbits HD 159868 in the constellation Scorpius

Discovery
- Discovered by: O'Toole et al.
- Discovery date: February 9, 2007
- Detection method: radial velocity

Orbital characteristics
- Semi-major axis: 2.25 ± 0.03 AU (336.6 ± 4.5 Gm)
- Eccentricity: 0.01±0.03
- Orbital period (sidereal): 1178.4±8.8 d
- Time of periastron: 2,453,435±56 JD
- Argument of periastron: 350°±171°
- Semi-amplitude: 38.3±1.1 km/s

Physical characteristics
- Mass: ≥2.10±0.11 M_{J}

HD 159868 b is an extrasolar planet that orbits HD 159868. It is a jovian planet. The orbit is nearly circular at the average distance of 2.25 AU.

== See also ==
- HD 219828 b
