= HD 159868 =

Star in the constellation Scorpius

Observation data Epoch J2000 Equinox ICRS
- Constellation: Scorpius
- Right ascension: 17^{h} 38^{m} 59.5269^{s}
- Declination: −43° 08′ 43.842″
- Apparent magnitude (V): +7.24

Characteristics
- Evolutionary stage: subgiant
- Spectral type: G5V
- Apparent magnitude (J): 5.941±0.021
- Apparent magnitude (H): 5.567±0.026
- Apparent magnitude (K): 5.535±0.024
- B−V color index: 0.714±0.012

Astrometry
| Radial velocity (R_{v}) | −23.80±0.76 km/s |
| Proper motion (μ) | RA: −230.824 mas/yr Dec.: −167.903 mas/yr |
| Parallax (π) | 17.8754±0.0207 mas |
| Distance | 182.5 ± 0.2 ly (55.94 ± 0.06 pc) |
| Absolute magnitude (M_{V}) | +3.63 |

Details
| Mass | 1.123±0.018 M_{☉} |
| Radius | 1.97±0.04 R_{☉} R_{☉} |
| Luminosity | 3.82 L_{☉} |
| Surface gravity (log g) | 3.96±0.02 cgs |
| Temperature | 5,558±15 K |
| Metallicity [Fe/H] | −0.08±0.01 dex |
| Rotation | 7.26 days |
| Rotational velocity (v sin i) | 2.1 km/s |
| Age | 6.6±0.2 Gyr |

Other designations
- CD−43°11901, GJ 4014, HD 159868, HIP 86375, SAO 228234

Database references
| SIMBAD | data |

HD 159868 is a star in the southern constellation of Scorpius, positioned about 0.3° to the ESE of the bright star Theta Scorpii. With an apparent visual magnitude of +7.24, it is too faint to be visible to the naked eye but can be viewed with a small telescope. The star lies at a distance of 182 light years from the Sun based on parallax, but is drifting closer with a radial velocity of −24 km/s.

== Properties ==
The spectrum of HD 159868 matches a G-type main-sequence star with a stellar classification of G5V. It has a relatively low surface gravity for its class, which suggests it is slightly evolved off the main sequence. The star is chromospherically inactive with a slow rotation rate, having a projected rotational velocity of 2.1 km/s. It is an estimated 6.6 billion years old with 8–12% more mass than the Sun and nearly double the Sun's radius. The star is radiating 3.8 times the luminosity of the Sun from its photosphere at an effective temperature of 5,558 K.

== Planetary system ==
In 2007, a planet of the star was announced by astronomer Simon J. O'Toole and collaborators. The planet (designated HD 159868 b) is likely to be a gas giant. Preliminary orbital elements suggested the orbit is extremely eccentric at the average distance of 2 astronomical units (AU), ranging as close as 0.62 AU to as far as 3.38 AU. In 2012, a second planet of the star was announced by astronomer Robert A. Wittenmyer and associates. The orbit of the first planet was significantly revised during the investigation.

The HD 159868 planetary system
| Companion (in order from star) | Mass | Semimajor axis (AU) | Orbital period (days) | Eccentricity | Inclination (°) | Radius |
|---|---|---|---|---|---|---|
| c | ≥0.73±0.05 M_{J} | 1.00±0.01 | 352.3±1.3 | 0.15±0.05 | — | — |
| b | ≥2.1±0.1 M_{J} | 2.25±0.03 | 1,178.4±8.8 | 0.01±0.03 | — | — |

== See also ==
- HD 219828
- HD 28185
- List of extrasolar planets
