= HD 143361 =

Star in the constellation Norma

Observation data Epoch J2000 Equinox ICRS
- Constellation: Norma
- Right ascension: 16^{h} 01^{m} 50.34828^{s}
- Declination: −44° 26′ 04.3434″
- Apparent magnitude (V): 9.20

Characteristics
- Evolutionary stage: main sequence
- Spectral type: G6 V
- Apparent magnitude (B): ~9.93
- Apparent magnitude (V): ~9.16
- Apparent magnitude (J): 7.905±0.026}
- Apparent magnitude (H): 7.572±0.038
- Apparent magnitude (K): 7.488±0.018
- B−V color index: 0.773

Astrometry
Radial velocity (R_{v})	−0.56±0.16 km/s
Proper motion (μ)	RA: −156.561 mas/yr Dec.: −120.231 mas/yr
Parallax (π)	14.5456±0.0202 mas
Distance	224.2 ± 0.3 ly (68.75 ± 0.10 pc)

Details
Mass	1.01 M_{☉}
Radius	1.02 R_{☉}
Luminosity	0.85 L_{☉}
Surface gravity (log g)	4.36 cgs
Temperature	5,503 K
Metallicity [Fe/H]	+0.18 dex
Rotation	41 days
Rotational velocity (v sin i)	1.7 km/s
Age	5.8 Gyr

Other designations
- CD–44°10569, HD 143361, HIP 78521, SAO 226454

Database references
SIMBAD	data

HD 143361 is a star in the southern constellation Norma. With an apparent visual magnitude of 9.20, this star is too dim to be seen with the naked eye. It is close enough to the Earth that its distance can be determined using parallax measurements, yielding a value of 224 light-years (69 parsecs).

This is a G-type main sequence star with a stellar classification of G6 V. It has around 101% of the Sun's mass and is around 5.8 billion years old.

HD 143361 is part of a binary star system. A red dwarf star has a similar distance and similar proper motions with the primary. Its orbit is very wide, as the angular separation of 33 arcminutes translates to a projected separation of 135,000 AU (2.13 light-years).

== Planetary system ==
In October 2008 the exoplanet HD 143361 b was reported to be orbiting this star. This object was detected using the radial velocity method during an astronomical survey conducted by the Magellan Planet Search Program using the MIKE echelle spectrograph on the 6.5-m Magellan II (Clay) telescope. In 2023, the inclination and true mass of HD 143361 b were determined via astrometry.

The HD 143361 planetary system
Companion (in order from star)	Mass	Semimajor axis (AU)	Orbital period (years)	Eccentricity	Inclination (°)	Radius
b	4.35+1.2 −0.66 M_{J}	1.994±0.018	2.8538+0.0031 −0.003	0.1938+0.0047 −0.0046	55+22 −15 or 125+15 −22	—

== See also ==
- List of extrasolar planets
