= HD 70642 b =

Exoplanet

Discovery
- Discovered by: Carter et al.
- Discovery site: Anglo-Australian Observatory
- Discovery date: July 3, 2003
- Detection method: Radial velocity (Anglo-Australian Telescope)

Orbital characteristics
- Semi-major axis: 3.295±0.021 AU
- Eccentricity: 0.04+0.034 −0.027
- Orbital period (sidereal): 2101+14 −13 d 5.751+0.038 −0.035 yr
- Average orbital speed: 17.06
- Inclination: 29.9°+2.6° −2.4° or 150.1°+2.4° −2.6°
- Longitude of ascending node: 60.7°+8.8° −8.6°
- Time of periastron: 2455918+358 −337
- Argument of periastron: 258°+51° −66°
- Semi-amplitude: 30.4 ± 1.3
- Star: HD 70642

Physical characteristics
- Mass: 3.9+0.29 −0.27 M_{J}

HD 70642 b is an exoplanet orbiting the star HD 70642 at a distance of 3.23 AU, taking 5.66 years to complete an orbit. This planet may have systems of moons like Jupiter. This planet was discovered on July 3, 2003. It is located about 95 light-years away in the constellation Puppis. In 2023, the inclination and true mass of HD 70642 b were determined via astrometry.

== See also ==
- 55 Cancri d
- Gliese 777 b
- HD 28185 b
- Mu Arae e
- Pi Mensae b
