= HD 66428 b =

Long-period jovian exoplanet in the constellation of Monoceros

Discovery
- Discovered by: Butler et al.
- Discovery site: (United States) California
- Discovery date: July 15, 2006
- Detection method: Radial velocity

Orbital characteristics
- Semi-major axis: 3.395+0.141 −0.157 AU
- Eccentricity: 0.471±0.012
- Orbital period (sidereal): 6.214+0.015 −0.016 yr
- Inclination: 16.639°+10.121° −2.959°
- Longitude of ascending node: 299.391°+8.486° −8.219°
- Time of periastron: 2450057.763+16.562 −18.431
- Argument of periastron: 185.689°+1.688° −1.596°
- Semi-amplitude: 54.441+1.035 −1.167 m/s
- Star: HD 66428

Physical characteristics
- Mass: 10.946+2.442 −3.845 M_{J}

HD 66428 b is a long-period jovian exoplanet located approximately 174 light-years away in the constellation of Monoceros. It has a minimum mass of 2.82 M_{J} and takes 1973 days or 5.402 years to orbit around its solar-type star HD 66428. The average distance is 3.18 AU, about half the distance between Mars and Jupiter. This planet is a so-called eccentric Jupiter with an orbital eccentricity of 0.465. At periastron, the distance is 1.70 AU and at apastron, the distance is 4.66 AU. In 2022, the inclination and true mass of HD 66428 b were measured via astrometry.

== See also ==
- HD 70642 b
