= Wittenmyer =

Wittenmyer is a surname. Notable people with the surname include:

- Annie Turner Wittenmyer (1827–1900), American social reformer and writer
- Edmund Wittenmyer (1862–1937), American military officer
- Robert A. Wittenmyer (born 1976), American-born Australian astrophysicist and astronomer
