= HD 48265 =

Star in the constellation Puppis

HD 48265 / Nosaxa
Observation data Epoch J2000 Equinox ICRS
- Constellation: Puppis
- Right ascension: 06^{h} 40^{m} 01.72703^{s}
- Declination: −48° 32′ 31.0433″
- Apparent magnitude (V): 8.07

Characteristics
- Evolutionary stage: subgiant
- Spectral type: G5IV/V
- Apparent magnitude (B): ~8.80
- Apparent magnitude (J): 6.842±0.021
- Apparent magnitude (H): 6.529±0.061
- Apparent magnitude (K): 6.449±0.020

Astrometry
Radial velocity (R_{v})	+23.51±0.13 km/s
Proper motion (μ)	RA: +26.513 mas/yr Dec.: +29.760 mas/yr
Parallax (π)	11.0065±0.0162 mas
Distance	296.3 ± 0.4 ly (90.9 ± 0.1 pc)
Absolute magnitude (M_{V})	3.34

Details
Mass	1.312±0.064 M_{☉}
Radius	1.901±0.126 R_{☉}
Luminosity	3.84±0.19 L_{☉}
Surface gravity (log g)	3.970±0.048 cgs
Temperature	5,733±55 K
Metallicity [Fe/H]	+0.30±0.04 dex
Rotation	~45 days
Rotational velocity (v sin i)	3.1±0.3 km/s
Age	4.201±0.625 Gyr

Other designations
- Nosaxa, CD−48 2430, HD 48265, HIP 31895, SAO 218115

Database references
SIMBAD	data
Exoplanet Archive	data

HD 48265, also named Nosaxa, is a star in the southern constellation Puppis. It has an apparent visual magnitude of 8.07, which makes it too faint to be seen with the naked eye. Based upon parallax measurements made during the Gaia mission, it is located at a distance of 296 light-years (91 parsecs) from Earth. It hosts two known planets, HD 48265 b and c. This star appears close in the sky to Canopus, the second-brightest star in earth's sky, and is also a similar distance away. Because of this Canopus is the brightest star in the sky of Nosaxa's planets (other than Nosaxa itself), and, at magnitude -5.87 would appear far brighter than any star or planet seen from earth (other than the moon and the sun). (Note: calculated using each star's distance, position in the sky, and brightness)

== Nomenclature ==
HD 48265 is the star's designation in the Henry Draper Catalogue.

This was one of the systems selected to be named in the 2019 NameExoWorlds campaign during the 100th anniversary of the IAU, which assigned each country a star and planet to be named. This system was assigned to Argentina. HD 48265 is named Nosaxa 'springtime' and HD 48265 b Naqaỹa 'brother' in the Moqoit (Mocoví) language.

== Stellar properties ==
This star has a stellar classification of G5IV/V, suggesting that, at an age of 4.8 billion years, it has reached an intermediate evolutionary stage between a main sequence star and a subgiant. It has but 93% of the mass of the Sun, while its outer atmosphere has begun to expand, reaching about 2.3 times the Sun's radius. HD 48265 is radiating 62% of the Sun's luminosity from its atmosphere at an effective temperature of 5,508 K, giving it the yellowish glow of a G-type star. Measurement of the chemical abundances of this star indicate that, compared to the Sun, it has a 95% greater proportion of elements other than hydrogen and helium—what astronomers term the star's metallicity.

== Planetary system ==
In October 2008 an exoplanet, HD 48265 b (later named Naqaỹa), was reported to be orbiting this star. This object was detected using the radial velocity method during an astronomical survey conducted by the Magellan Planet Search Program using the MIKE echelle spectrograph on the 6.5-m Magellan II (Clay) telescope. A second planet was found in 2026 using a combination of radial velocity and astrometry. Both are gas giants more massive than Jupiter; they may be on mutually inclined orbits.

The HD 48265 planetary system (Note: Planet b is listed with its minimum mass; including astrometric data suggests a larger true mass of 7.4+3.7 −3.9 M_{J}, but this is uncertain since this planet's astrometric signal is not significant.)
Companion (in order from star)	Mass	Semimajor axis (AU)	Orbital period (days)	Eccentricity	Inclination (°)	Radius
b / Naqaỹa	≥1.67±0.06 M_{J}	1.87+0.02 −0.04	789.6±1.1	0.35±0.02	11.7+11.0 −3.4 or 160.1+8.3 −31	—
c	4.45+0.75 −0.37 M_{J}	10.4+1.6 −1.0	10418+2451 −1412	0.41+0.08 −0.06	89±29	—

== See also ==
- List of extrasolar planets
