= Pi Mensae b =

Super-Jovian planet orbiting Pi Mensae

Discovery
- Discovered by: Jones et al.
- Discovery site: (Australia) Anglo-Australian; Telescope
- Discovery date: 15 October 2001
- Detection method: Doppler spectroscopy

Orbital characteristics
- Semi-major axis: 3.237+0.041 −0.042 AU
- Eccentricity: 0.64362+0.00054 −0.00053
- Orbital period (sidereal): 2,088.79 ± 0.37 days (5.7188 ± 0.0010 years)
- Inclination: 57.2°+3.2° −2.8°
- Longitude of ascending node: 271.5°±5.4°
- Time of periastron: 2456540.34±0.75
- Argument of periastron: −29.25°+0.15° −0.15°
- Semi-amplitude: 194.07±0.20 m/s (host star)
- Star: Pi Mensae

Physical characteristics
- Mass: 11.39+0.50 −0.47 M_{J}

Pi Mensae b (π Men b, π Mensae b), also known as HD 39091 b, is an extrasolar planet approximately 60 light-years away in the constellation of Mensa. The planet was announced orbiting the yellow main-sequence star Pi Mensae in October 2001.

== Detection and discovery ==
On October 15, 2001, a team of astronomers including Jones, Butler, Tinney, Marcy, Penny, McCarthy, Carter, and Pourbaix announced the discovery of one of the most massive extrasolar planets that have yet been observed. It was discovered by the Anglo-Australian Planet Search team, using a Doppler spectrometer mounted on the Anglo-Australian Telescope.

== Physical characteristics ==
Pi Mensae b has a very eccentric orbit and takes 5.72 years to revolve around the star. The semi-major axis of the planet's orbit around the star is 3.24 AU. This planet passes through the star's habitable zone at periastron (1.15 AU) while at apastron, it passes to around Jupiter-Sun distance (5.32 AU). The gravitational influence of this planet would disrupt the orbit of any potentially Earth-like planet.

Pi Mensae b is over ten times more massive than Jupiter, the most massive planet in the Solar System.

In 2020, the true mass of Pi Mensae b was measured to be 14.1 M_{J} via astrometry. Since this is greater than 13 Jupiter masses, the object could be considered a brown dwarf. A 2022 study have revised this mass estimate slightly downward, to 12.33 M_{J}, and as of 2026 the most recent astrometric study revised it to 11.4 M_{J}, which is precise to less than 5%.

The plane of orbit of Pi Mensae b is strongly inclined to equatorial plane of the star, with the misalignment equal to 24±4.1°.

== See also ==
- 30 Arietis Bb
- Gliese 777 b
- HD 70642 b
