= Gliese 777 Ac =

Extrasolar planet in the constellation Cygnus

Discovery
- Discovered by: Marcy et al.
- Discovery site: United States
- Discovery date: 24 June 2005
- Detection method: Doppler spectroscopy

Orbital characteristics
- Semi-major axis: 0.1296+0.0017 −0.0018 AU
- Eccentricity: 0.165+0.023 −0.024
- Orbital period (sidereal): 0.0468647(14) years (17.12 days)
- Time of periastron: 2,455,210.27±0.42
- Argument of periastron: 323.4°+9.2° −9.1°
- Star: Gliese 777 A

Physical characteristics
- Mass: 25.4+15.6 −3.5 M_{🜨}

Gliese 777 Ac, also known as HD 190360 c, is an extrasolar planet approximately 52 light-years away in the constellation of Cygnus. The planet was discovered orbiting the primary star of the Gliese 777 system in 2005 using the radial velocity method and confirmed in 2009. The planet was once called the "smallest extrasolar planet discovered", but this is currently no longer the case. With a mass just 25 times that of the Earth, the planet is likely a "hot Neptune" planet, a small Jovian planet, or possibly a large terrestrial planet (a super-Earth).

== See also ==
- Gliese 436 b
- Gliese 876 b
- MOA-2007-BLG-192Lb
