= HD 143361 b =

Extrasolar planet in the constellation Norma

Discovery
- Discovered by: Minniti et al.
- Discovery date: October 29, 2008
- Detection method: Doppler spectroscopy

Orbital characteristics
- Semi-major axis: 1.994±0.018 AU
- Eccentricity: 0.1938+0.0047 −0.0046
- Orbital period (sidereal): 1042.4±1.1 d 2.8538+0.0031 −0.003 yr
- Inclination: 55°+22° −15° or 125°+15° −22°
- Longitude of ascending node: 33°+128° −21°
- Time of periastron: 2455761.5±4.1
- Argument of periastron: 240.4°+1.4° −1.5°
- Semi-amplitude: 72.1±1.0
- Star: HD 143361

Physical characteristics
- Mass: 4.35+1.2 −0.66 M_{J}

HD 143361 b is an exoplanet located approximately 224 light-years away in the constellation of Norma, orbiting the 9th magnitude G-type main sequence star HD 143361. This planet has a minimum mass of 3.0 times that of Jupiter. Because the inclination was initially unknown, the true mass was not known. This planet orbits at a distance of 2.0 AU with an orbital eccentricity of 0.18.

This object was detected using the radial velocity method during an astronomical survey conducted by the Magellan Planet Search Program using the MIKE echelle spectrograph on the 6.5-m Magellan II (Clay) telescope. In 2023, the inclination and true mass of HD 143361 b were determined via astrometry.
