= HD 66428 =

Star in the constellation Monoceros

Observation data Epoch J2000.0 Equinox ICRS
- Constellation: Monoceros
- Right ascension: 08^{h} 03^{m} 28.66767^{s}
- Declination: −01° 09′ 45.7581″
- Apparent magnitude (V): 8.25

Characteristics
- Evolutionary stage: subgiant
- Spectral type: G8IV(+G)

Astrometry
Radial velocity (R_{v})	44.26±0.13 km/s
Proper motion (μ)	RA: −65.766±0.029 mas/yr Dec.: −206.999±0.019 mas/yr
Parallax (π)	18.7661±0.0312 mas
Distance	173.8 ± 0.3 ly (53.29 ± 0.09 pc)
Absolute magnitude (M_{V})	+4.56

Details
Mass	1.09±0.02 M_{☉}
Radius	1.13±0.03 R_{☉}
Luminosity	1.28±0.01 L_{☉}
Surface gravity (log g)	4.37±0.03 cgs
Temperature	5,773±55 K
Age	4.1±1.4 Gyr

Other designations
- BD−00°1891, HIP 39417, LTT 3038, SAO 135426

Database references
SIMBAD	data

HD 66428 is a G-type subgiant star located approximately 174 light-years away in the constellation of Monoceros. This star is similar to the Sun with an apparent magnitude of 8.25, an effective temperature of 5,705±27 K and a solar luminosity 1.28. Its absolute magnitude is 11.1 while its U-V color index is 0.71. It is considered an inactive star and it is metal-rich ([Fe/H] = 0.310). This star has a precise mass of 1.14552 solar masses. This precision comes from the Corot mission that measured asteroseismology.

== Planetary system ==
In July 2006, the discovery of the extrasolar planet HD 66428 b was published in the Astrophysical Journal. It was found from observations at the W. M. Keck Observatory using the radial velocity method. It has a minimum mass of more than 3 times that of Jupiter and orbits at a distance of 3.47 AU away from the star.

In 2015 a refined orbit was determined which led to the discovery of a linear trend in the radial velocities indicating a more distant companion of unknown character, which was determined to be a gas giant planet HD 66428 c or brown dwarf in 2021. In 2022, the inclination and true mass of both planets were measured via astrometry. The orbital period and mass of planet c were found to be significantly lower than the previous higher-error estimates, showing it to be planetary mass and not a brown dwarf.

The HD 66428 planetary system
Companion (in order from star)	Mass	Semimajor axis (AU)	Orbital period (years)	Eccentricity	Inclination (°)	Radius
b	10.946+2.442 −3.845 M_{J}	3.395+0.141 −0.157	6.214+0.015 −0.016	0.471±0.012	16.639+10.121 −2.959	—
c	1.764+3.404 −0.041 M_{J}	9.408+1.945 −1.267	28.690+9.206 −5.348	0.207+0.097 −0.098	93.938+57.003 −55.476	—

== See also ==
- List of extrasolar planets
