= HD 39194 =

Star in the constellation Mensa

Observation data Epoch J2000.0 Equinox ICRS
- Constellation: Mensa
- Right ascension: 05^{h} 44^{m} 31.9180^{s}
- Declination: −70° 08′ 36.858″
- Apparent magnitude (V): 8.07±0.01

Characteristics
- Spectral type: K0 V
- U−B color index: +0.26
- B−V color index: +0.76

Astrometry
Radial velocity (R_{v})	13.90±0.10 km/s
Proper motion (μ)	RA: −309.273 mas/yr Dec.: +1238.862 mas/yr
Parallax (π)	37.8235±0.0206 mas
Distance	86.23 ± 0.05 ly (26.44 ± 0.01 pc)
Absolute magnitude (M_{V})	+6.02

Details
Mass	0.71 M_{☉}
Luminosity	0.389 L_{☉}
Surface gravity (log g)	4.61±0.05 cgs
Temperature	5,205±23 K
Metallicity [Fe/H]	−0.61±0.02 dex
Rotational velocity (v sin i)	2 km/s
Age	11.7 Gyr

Other designations
- CD−70°340, CPD−70°447, GJ 217.2, HD 39194, HIP 27080, SAO 256232, LHS 210

Database references
SIMBAD	data
Exoplanet Archive	data
ARICNS	data

HD 39194 (Gliese 217.2; LHS 210) is a star located in the southern circumpolar constellation Mensa. It has an apparent magnitude of 8.07, making it readily visible in binoculars but not to the naked eye. The object is relatively close at a distance of 86 light years but is receding with a heliocentric radial velocity of 13.9 km/s.

== Characteristics ==
HD 39194 has a general stellar classification of K0 V, indicating that it is a K-type main-sequence star. Houk & Cowley found a slightly warmer class of G8 V, instead making it a G-type main-sequence star. Nevertheless, it has 71% the mass of the Sun and an effective temperature of 5,205 K, giving an orange hue. Its photosphere radiates a luminosity only 38% that of the Sun. HD 39194 is estimated to be 11.7 billion years old and is extremely chromospherically inactive. Despite being a planetary host, it has an iron abundance only 24% that of the Sun. HD 39194's projected rotational velocity is similar to the Sun's, with the value being 2 km/s.

== Planetary system ==
Three planet candidates around this star were first reported in a 2011 preprint. After 10 years of observations, a team of astronomers confirmed 3 super-Earths circling HD 39194 in eccentric orbits; none of the planets are in the habitable zone. HD 39194 b and d have similar masses.

The HD 39194 planetary system
Companion (in order from star)	Mass	Semimajor axis (AU)	Orbital period (days)	Eccentricity	Inclination (°)	Radius
b	≥4.13±0.20 M_{🜨}	0.056±0.001	5.6368±0.0004	<0.207	—	—
c	≥6.29±0.51 M_{🜨}	0.103±0.002	14.030±0.003	<0.154	—	—
d	≥4.13±0.60 M_{🜨}	0.185±0.003	33.91±0.03	<0.333	—	—

== See also ==
- List of multiplanetary systems
- Pi Mensae, another exoplanet-hosting star in the same constellation.
