= HD 219828 =

Star in the constellation Pegasus

Observation data Epoch J2000 Equinox ICRS
- Constellation: Pegasus
- Right ascension: 23^{h} 18^{m} 46.73416^{s}
- Declination: +18° 38′ 44.6194″
- Apparent magnitude (V): 8.04

Characteristics
- Evolutionary stage: subgiant
- Spectral type: G0IV
- B−V color index: 0.654

Astrometry
Radial velocity (R_{v})	−24.07±0.12 km/s
Proper motion (μ)	RA: −5.010±0.028 mas/yr Dec.: 5.758±0.022 mas/yr
Parallax (π)	13.7872±0.0278 mas
Distance	236.6 ± 0.5 ly (72.5 ± 0.1 pc)
Absolute magnitude (M_{V})	3.58

Details
Mass	1.23±0.10 M_{☉}
Radius	1.69 R_{☉}
Luminosity	3.08 L_{☉}
Surface gravity (log g)	4.08±0.10 cgs
Temperature	5,891±18 K
Metallicity [Fe/H]	+0.19±0.03 dex
Rotational velocity (v sin i)	2.9 km/s
Age	4.6±0.7 Gyr

Other designations
- BD+17°4896, HIP 115100, SAO 108536, GSC 01716-01182

Database references
SIMBAD	data

HD 219828 is a star with two exoplanetary companions in the constellation of Pegasus. With an apparent visual magnitude of 8.04, it is an eighth magnitude star that is too dim to be readily visible to the naked eye. The star is located at a distance of approximately 237 light years from the Sun based on parallax measurements, but is drifting closer with a radial velocity of −24 km/s.

The stellar classification of this star is G0IV, matching a subgiant star that is ending the hydrogen fusion in its core. It is a metal-rich star that has slightly evolved off the main sequence. HD 219828 is older than two billion years with a low level of chromospheric activity and is spinning with a projected rotational velocity of 2.9 km/s. It has 1.23 times the mass of the Sun with radius estimates ranging from 1.47 to 1.69 the Sun's girth. The star is radiating three times the luminosity of the Sun from its slightly enlarged photosphere at an effective temperature of 5,891 K.

== Planetary system ==
In 2007, a Neptune-mass planet was found orbiting the star by Melo. According to the author, assuming an Earth-like rocky composition, the planet could have a radius 2.2 times that of Earth. This could be demonstrated if a transit were observed, though, as authors state, it would be a difficult task. At this point, it was suggested that a best fit orbital solution hints the presence of an additional planetary companion (so far unconfirmed) with 70% of Jupiter's mass, likely orbital separation of 0.68 Astronomical units and eccentric orbit (e=0.3). However, in 2016, refined analysis of the radial velocity data confirmed the presence of an outer planet (or possibly a brown dwarf) larger and more eccentric than was originally believed. With a high eccentricity and a high mass ratio between the two planets, the system is quite unique. The planet c is a potential target for Gaia astrometry or atmospheric characterization using direct imaging or high-resolution spectroscopy, and in 2022 its inclination and true mass were measured using Gaia astrometry.

The HD 219828 planetary system
Companion (in order from star)	Mass	Semimajor axis (AU)	Orbital period (days)	Eccentricity	Inclination (°)	Radius
b	≥21.0±1.4 M_{🜨}	0.045	3.834887±0.000096	0.059±0.036	—	—
c	16.054+3.520 −1.270 M_{J}	5.657+0.228 −0.242	4789.9+90.7 −80.7	0.811±0.004	122.816+11.012 −69.974	—

== See also ==
- HD 159868
- List of extrasolar planets
