= HD 38283 b =

Exoplanet in the constellation of Mensa

Yanyan
Discovery
- Discovered by: Tinney et al.
- Discovery site: Anglo-Australian Observatory
- Discovery date: 2011-04-11
- Detection method: Radial velocity

Orbital characteristics
- Apastron: 1.44 AU (215 million km)
- Periastron: 0.60 AU (90 million km)
- Semi-major axis: 1.02 ± 0.07 AU (153 ± 10 million km)
- Eccentricity: 0.41 ± 0.16
- Orbital period (sidereal): 363.2 ± 1.6 d 0.994 y
- Average orbital speed: 29.78
- Time of periastron: 2,450,802.6 ± 12
- Star: Bubup

Yanyan, originally named HD 38283 b, is an extrasolar planet, orbiting the 7th-magnitude F-type main-sequence star Bubup, 123 light-years away in the constellation Mensa. It is a Saturn-like planet orbiting at Earth-like distance, though slightly inwards of its star's habitable zone. Its eccentricity is 0.41, much higher than the Earth's eccentricity of 0.017. The planet's distance ranges from about 0.60 AU (closer to its star than Venus is to the Sun) and 1.44 AU (nearly as distant from its star as Mars is to the Sun). This planet takes 363.2 days to orbit the star, just two days less compared to the Earth's orbital period of 365.256366 days. Its mass is one-third that of Jupiter but its size and density are not known. Since inclination is not known, its actual mass is unknown, either slightly greater or much greater than its lower limit.

== History and discovery ==
Yanyan was discovered on 11 April 2011 using the radial velocity technique using the Anglo-Australian Telescope (AAT), and assigned the name HD 38283 b. This method uses to look for planets by watching the star periodically wobble caused by the gravitational tug of the orbiting planets.

The planet was officially named Yanyan by representatives of Australia in the 2019 NameExoWorlds contest held by the IAU. The word "Yanyan" is the Boonwurrung word for "boy".
