= HD 33519 =

Binary in the constellation of Mensa

Observation data Epoch J2000.0 Equinox ICRS
- Constellation: Mensa
- Right ascension: 05^{h} 00^{m} 13.23704^{s}
- Declination: −78° 18′ 00.0987″
- Apparent magnitude (V): 6.28±0.01

Characteristics
- Evolutionary stage: red giant branch
- Spectral type: K5/M0 III
- U−B color index: +1.87
- B−V color index: +1.51

Astrometry
Radial velocity (R_{v})	−2.5±2.3 km/s
Proper motion (μ)	RA: −17.781 mas/yr Dec.: +1.497 mas/yr
Parallax (π)	3.4534±0.0872 mas
Distance	940 ± 20 ly (290 ± 7 pc)
Absolute magnitude (M_{V})	−0.88

Details
Mass	4.34 M_{☉}
Radius	45.4 R_{☉}
Luminosity	465 L_{☉}
Surface gravity (log g)	1.45^{+0.02}_{−0.03} cgs
Temperature	4,118±122 K
Metallicity [Fe/H]	−0.01 dex
Rotational velocity (v sin i)	<1 km/s

Other designations
- 19 G. Mensae, CD−78°190, CPD−78°165, HD 33519, HIP 23251, HR 1682, SAO 256153, WDS J05002-7818A

Database references
SIMBAD	data

HD 33519, also known as HR 1682, is a probable spectroscopic binary located in the southern circumpolar constellation Mensa. It is one of the stars near the limit of naked eye visibility, having an apparent magnitude of 6.28. The system is relatively far at a distance of 940 light years but is approaching with a heliocentric radial velocity of −2.5 km/s. However, this value is poorly constrained.

The visible component has a stellar classification of K5/M0 III, indicating an evolved red giant with the characteristics of a K5 and M0 giant star. At present it has 4.34 times the mass of the Sun but has expanded to 45.4 times its girth. It shines with a luminosity of 465 L_{☉} from its enlarged photosphere at an effective temperature of 4,118 K, giving it an orange-red hue when viewed in the night sky. HD 33519's metallicity, what astronomers dub as elements heavier than helium, is around the solar level. Like most giants, it spins slowly, with its projected rotational velocity being lower than 1 km/s.

There is an 11th magnitude optical companion located 50.2″ away along a position angle of 110°. It has no relation to the system, having a drastically different proper motion.
