= Pi Mensae =

Star in the constellation Mensa

- Location of π Mensae (circled in red)

Observation data Epoch J2000.0 Equinox ICRS
- Constellation: Mensa
- Right ascension: 05^{h} 37^{m} 09.88684^{s}
- Declination: −80° 28′ 08.8346″
- Apparent magnitude (V): +5.65

Characteristics
- Evolutionary stage: main sequence
- Spectral type: G0 V
- U−B color index: 0.11
- B−V color index: 0.60
- V−R color index: 0.31
- R−I color index: 0.29

Astrometry
Radial velocity (R_{v})	10.71±0.12 km/s
Proper motion (μ)	RA: 310.909 mas/yr Dec.: 1,049.060 mas/yr
Parallax (π)	54.6825±0.0354 mas
Distance	59.65 ± 0.04 ly (18.29 ± 0.01 pc)
Absolute magnitude (M_{V})	+4.35±0.01

Details
Mass	1.091±0.031 M_{☉}
Radius	1.136±0.011 R_{☉}
Luminosity	1.532±0.004 L_{☉}
Surface gravity (log g)	4.365±0.007 cgs
Temperature	6,013±18 K
Metallicity [Fe/H]	0.09 dex
Rotational velocity (v sin i)	2.96 km/s
Age	3.8±0.8 Gyr

Other designations
- π Men, CD−80°195, CPD−80°161, GJ 9189, HD 39091, HIP 26394, HR 2022, SAO 258421, LFT 429, LHS 208, LTT 2359, TOI-144

Database references
SIMBAD	data
Exoplanet Archive	data
ARICNS	data

Pi Mensae (π Men), also known as HD 39091, is a G-dwarf star in the constellation of Mensa. This star has a high proper motion. The apparent magnitude is 5.67, which can be visible to the naked eye in exceptionally dark, clear skies. It is nearly 60 light-years away. The star is slightly larger than the Sun in terms of mass, size, luminosity, temperature and metallicity, and is about 730 million years younger. It hosts three known planets.

== Planetary system ==
On October 15, 2001, an extrasolar planet was found orbiting the star. Pi Mensae b is one of the most massive planets ever discovered, and has a very eccentric orbit that takes approximately 2,151 days (5.89 years) to complete. Because of its eccentricity, and being a massive brown dwarf that passes through the habitable zone, it would have disrupted the orbits of any Earth-like planets, and possibly thrown them into the star, or out into the interstellar medium.

Incorporating more accurate Hipparcos data yields a mass range for the companion to be anywhere from 10.27 to 29.9 times that of Jupiter, confirming its substellar nature with the upper limit of mass putting it in the brown dwarf range. In 2020, the true mass of Pi Mensae b was measured to be 14.1 M_{J} via astrometry. Since this is greater than 13 Jupiter masses, the object could be considered a brown dwarf, although more recent astrometric results suggest a slightly lower mass. Pi Mensae was ranked 100th on the list of top 100 target stars for the planned (but now-canceled) Terrestrial Planet Finder mission to search for Earth-like planets.

On September 16, 2018, a preprint was posted to arXiv detailing the discovery of a super-Earth on a 6.27-day orbit around the star, the first exoplanet detection by the Transiting Exoplanet Survey Satellite (TESS) submitted for publication. This was confirmed two days later, where the attention was called that the system is amenable for future planet atmospheric studies.

In 2020, an analysis with Gaia DR2 and Hipparcos astrometry showed that planets b and c are located on orbits mutually inclined by 49°−131° (1 sigma), which causes planet c to not transit most of the time, and acquire large misalignments with its host star's spin axis.

Planet c likely formed on a wide orbit, and then migrated inward under the gravitational influence of the planet or brown dwarf b. It is likely to retain a portion of primordial, highly volatile atmosphere.

In 2022, the discovery by the radial velocity method of a third planet, Pi Mensae d, on a 125-day orbit was announced. Another 2022 study did not confirm this planet, but a 2023 study did detect it.

The Pi Mensae planetary system
Companion (in order from star)	Mass	Semimajor axis (AU)	Orbital period (days)	Eccentricity	Inclination (°)	Radius
c	3.63±0.38 M_{🜨}	0.06839±0.00050	6.267852±0.000016	0	87.05±0.15	2.131+0.037 −0.042 R_{🜨}
d	≥13.38±1.35 M_{🜨}	—	124.64+0.48 −0.52	0.220±0.079	—	—
b	11.39+0.50 −0.47 M_{J}	3.237+0.041 −0.042	2088.79+0.37 −0.36	0.64362+0.00054 −0.00053	57.2°+3.2° −2.8°	—

== See also ==
- Gliese 777
- HD 70642
- Lists of exoplanets
