= Mu Mensae =

Star in the constellation Mensa

Observation data Epoch J2000.0 Equinox J2000.0 (ICRS)
- Constellation: Mensa
- Right ascension: 04^{h} 43^{m} 03.964^{s}
- Declination: −70° 55′ 51.69″
- Apparent magnitude (V): 5.54

Characteristics
- Evolutionary stage: main sequence
- Spectral type: B8 II-III(p Si)
- U−B color index: −0.46
- B−V color index: −0.12

Astrometry
Radial velocity (R_{v})	−0.2±3.9 km/s
Proper motion (μ)	RA: +9.32 mas/yr Dec.: +34.93 mas/yr
Parallax (π)	6.9699±0.0631 mas
Distance	468 ± 4 ly (143 ± 1 pc)
Absolute magnitude (M_{V})	−0.36

Details
Mass	3.5 M_{☉}
Radius	3.3 R_{☉}
Luminosity	216 L_{☉}
Surface gravity (log g)	4.02 cgs
Temperature	12,550 K
Metallicity [Fe/H]	0.79 dex
Rotation	5.1918 d
Rotational velocity (v sin i)	30 km/s
Age	226 Myr

Other designations
- μ Men, CPD−71°282, HD 30612, HIP 21949, HR 1541, SAO 256122

Database references
SIMBAD	data

μ Mensae, Latinized as Mu Mensae, is a solitary, blue-white-hued star in the southern constellation of Mensa. With an apparent visual magnitude of 5.54, it is just bright enough to be faintly visible to the naked eye. Based upon an annual parallax shift of 6.8405 mas as seen from GAIA, this star is located roughly 477 light years from the Sun. At that distance, the visual magnitude is diminished by an extinction factor of 0.09 due to interstellar dust.

The stellar classification of B8 II-III(p Si) suggests that it is a B-type star with a spectrum that shows mixed traits of a giant and a bright giant star. It may be chemically peculiar with an overabundance of silicon in its outer atmosphere. The estimated radius of the star is 3.3 times that of the Sun. It is radiating 216 times the Sun's luminosity from its photosphere at an effective temperature of 12,550 K.
