= HD 22676 =

Star in the constellation Mensa

Observation data Epoch J2000 Equinox ICRS
- Constellation: Mensa
- Right ascension: 03^{h} 29^{m} 58.8930^{s}
- Declination: −78° 21′ 06.6634″
- Apparent magnitude (V): 5.67 ± 0.01

Characteristics
- Evolutionary stage: Horizontal branch
- Spectral type: G8 III
- U−B color index: +0.65
- B−V color index: +0.93

Astrometry
Radial velocity (R_{v})	18.4 ± 0.1 km/s
Proper motion (μ)	RA: −11.565 mas/yr Dec.: −26.933 mas/yr
Parallax (π)	9.8072±0.0355 mas
Distance	333 ± 1 ly (102.0 ± 0.4 pc)
Absolute magnitude (M_{V})	+0.72

Details
Mass	2.36 M_{☉}
Radius	9.33 R_{☉}
Luminosity	58.06 L_{☉}
Surface gravity (log g)	3.01 ± 0.09 cgs
Temperature	5,109 ± 32 K
Metallicity [Fe/H]	+0.06 ± 0.03 dex
Rotational velocity (v sin i)	3.4 ± 1 km/s
Age	750 Myr

Other designations
- 1 G. Mensae, CPD−78° 101, HD 22676, HIP 16290, HR 1109, SAO 255998

Database references
SIMBAD	data

HD 22676 (HR 1109) is a solitary star in the southern circumpolar constellation Mensa. It has an apparent magnitude of 5.67, making it faintly visible to the naked eye and is currently located at a distance of 333 light years. However, it is recceding from the sun with a radial velocity of 18.4 km/s.

HD 22676 has a stellar classification of G8 III, which indicates that is an evolved late G-type giant star currently on the horizontal branch, specifically the red clump region. At an age of 700 million years, it has expanded to 9.33 times the radius of the Sun. It has 2.36 times the Sun's mass and radiates at approximately 58 times the luminosity of the Sun from its enlarged photosphere at an effective temperature of 5,109 K, which gives it a yellow glow. HD 22676 is slightly metal enriched with an iron abundance 115% that of the Sun and spins lesuirely with a projected rotational velocity of 3.6 km/s.
