= HD 38283 =

Star in the constellation Mensa

HD 38283 / Bubup
Observation data Epoch J2000.0 Equinox ICRS
- Constellation: Mensa
- Right ascension: 05^{h} 37^{m} 02.0168^{s}
- Declination: −73° 41′ 57.645″
- Apparent magnitude (V): 6.70

Characteristics
- Evolutionary stage: subgiant
- Spectral type: F9.5 V
- B−V color index: 0.540

Astrometry
Radial velocity (R_{v})	61.50±0.13 km/s
Proper motion (μ)	RA: 138.794 mas/yr Dec.: −108.499 mas/yr
Parallax (π)	26.2854±0.0170 mas
Distance	124.08 ± 0.08 ly (38.04 ± 0.02 pc)
Absolute magnitude (M_{V})	3.82

Details
Mass	1.37 ± 0.07 M_{☉}
Radius	1.49 ± 0.0 R_{☉}
Luminosity	2.35 L_{☉}
Surface gravity (log g)	4.23 ± 0.02 cgs
Temperature	5,981 ± 12 K
Metallicity [Fe/H]	−0.18 dex
Rotational velocity (v sin i)	3.8 km/s
Age	7.43 Gyr

Other designations
- Bubup, CD−73°253, HD 38283, HIP 26380, SAO 256213, 2MASS J05370199-7341574

Database references
SIMBAD	data
Exoplanet Archive	data

HD 38283, or Bubup, is a star in the southern circumpolar constellation Mensa. With a magnitude of 6.70, it's invisible to the naked eye but can be seen with binoculars. Bubup is located relatively close at a distance of 124 light-years but is recceding with a heliocentric radial velocity of 61.5 km/s.

== Nomenclature ==
HD 38283 was given the name "Bubup", the Boonwurrung word for "child", by the IAU, chosen by representatives of Australia for the 2019 NameExoWorlds contest.

== Properties ==
HD 38283/Bubup has a stellar classification of F9.5 V, indicating that it is an ordinary late F-type main-sequence star just shy of being a G-type main-sequence star. At present it has 137% the mass of the Sun and 149% the radius of the Sun. It shines at about double the luminosity of the Sun from its photosphere at an effective temperature of 5981 K, which gives it a yellow glow. Unlike most planetary hosts, HD 38283/Bubup is metal-deficient with an iron abundance 66% that of the Sun and is older than the latter with an age of about 7 billion years. Currently, it spins leisurely with a projected rotational velocity of about 4 km/s.

A survey in 2015 has ruled out the existence of any stellar companions at projected distances above 11 AU.

== Planetary system ==
On April 11, 2011, a Saturnian planet, HD 38283 b (Yanyan), was discovered in an Earth-like 363-day orbit. HD 38283 b/Yanyan itself turns out to be unable to host habitable exomoons, both because of its significant eccentricity (for the single eccentric planet solution), and because of the overluminosity of its host star compared to the Sun.

The HD 38283 planetary system
Companion (in order from star)	Mass	Semimajor axis (AU)	Orbital period (days)	Eccentricity	Inclination (°)	Radius
b	≥0.289±0.034 M_{J}	1.020±0.002	361.0±1.1	0.474±0.136	—	—

== See also ==
- List of extrasolar planets detected by radial velocity
