= Kappa Mensae =

Star in the constellation of Mensa

κ Mensae
- Location of κ Mensae (circled)

Observation data Epoch J2000 Equinox ICRS
- Constellation: Mensa
- Right ascension: 05^{h} 50^{m} 16.7857^{s}
- Declination: −79° 21′ 40.900″
- Apparent magnitude (V): 5.45 ± 0.01

Characteristics
- Evolutionary stage: main sequence
- Spectral type: B9 V
- U−B color index: −0.24
- B−V color index: −0.08

Astrometry
Radial velocity (R_{v})	9.5 ± 2 km/s
Proper motion (μ)	RA: −4.815 mas/yr Dec.: +66.518 mas/yr
Parallax (π)	11.018±0.0604 mas
Distance	296 ± 2 ly (90.8 ± 0.5 pc)
Absolute magnitude (M_{V})	+0.78

Details
Mass	3.44 M_{☉}
Radius	1.95±0.09 R_{☉}
Luminosity	66.4+2.6 −2.5 L_{☉}
Surface gravity (log g)	4.21 cgs
Temperature	10,965±50 K
Metallicity [Fe/H]	0.00 dex
Rotational velocity (v sin i)	290 km/s
Age	115 Myr

Other designations
- κ Mensae, 32 G. Mensae, CPD−79°202, HD 40953, HIP 27566, HR 2125, SAO 256248

Database references
SIMBAD	data

Kappa Mensae, Latinized from κ Mensae, is a solitary star in the southern circumpolar constellation Mensa. Its distance of 296 light years based on its parallax shift gives it an apparent magnitude of 5.45, making it faintly visible to the naked eye. However, it is receding from the Sun with a heliocentric radial velocity of 9.5 km/s.

Kappa Mensae has a stellar classification of B9 V, indicating that it is an ordinary B-type main-sequence star. At present it has 3.44 times the mass of the Sun and a diameter of 1.95 R_{☉}. It radiates at 66 times the luminosity from its photosphere at an effective temperature of 10,965 K, giving it a bluish white hue. The star is very young, aged 115 million years, having completed only 33.7% of its main sequence lifetime. Kappa Mensae has a high rate of spin, rotating with a projected rotational velocity of 290 km/s.
