= Xi Mensae =

Star in the constellation Mensa

Observation data Epoch J2000.0 Equinox J2000.0 (ICRS)
- Constellation: Mensa
- Right ascension: 04^{h} 58^{m} 50.96791^{s}
- Declination: −82° 28′ 13.8521″
- Apparent magnitude (V): 5.84

Characteristics
- Spectral type: G8/K0III
- B−V color index: 0.932±0.006

Astrometry
Radial velocity (R_{v})	−4.7±0.2 km/s
Proper motion (μ)	RA: −4.701±0.091 mas/yr Dec.: +2.648±0.107 mas/yr
Parallax (π)	9.6939±0.0535 mas
Distance	336 ± 2 ly (103.2 ± 0.6 pc)
Absolute magnitude (M_{V})	0.57

Details
Mass	1.91 M_{☉}
Radius	8.97+0.22 −0.55 R_{☉}
Luminosity	50.3±0.4 L_{☉}
Surface gravity (log g)	3.02 cgs
Temperature	5,131+166 −60 K
Metallicity [Fe/H]	0.06 dex
Age	281 Myr

Other designations
- ξ Men, CPD−82°106, FK5 917, HD 34172, HIP 23148, HR 1716, SAO 258395

Database references
SIMBAD	data

ξ Mensae, Latinized as Xi Mensae, is a single star in the southern circumpolar constellation of Mensa. It has a yellow-orange hue and is just barely visible to the naked eye as a dim point of light with an apparent visual magnitude of 5.84. This object is located about 366 light-years away from the Sun based on parallax, and is drifting closer with a radial velocity of −5 km/s.

This object is an aging giant star with a stellar classification of G8/K0III. It is 281 million years old with 1.91 times the mass of the Sun. The star displays micro-variability, fluctuating in brightness by 0.0049 magnitudes with a period of 148 days. With the supply of hydrogen at its core exhausted, the star has cooled and expanded to nine times the Sun's radius. It is radiating 50 times the luminosity of the Sun from its swollen photosphere at an effective temperature of 5,131 K.
