= HD 28185 =

Star in the constellation Eridanus

Observation data Epoch J2000.0 Equinox ICRS
- Constellation: Eridanus
- Right ascension: 04^{h} 26^{m} 26.323^{s}
- Declination: −10° 33′ 02.95″
- Apparent magnitude (V): +7.80

Characteristics
- Evolutionary stage: Main sequence/subgiant
- Spectral type: G6.5IV-V
- B−V color index: 0.750±0.010

Astrometry
Radial velocity (R_{v})	50.40±0.14 km/s
Proper motion (μ)	RA: 84.070(18) mas/yr Dec.: −59.637(16) mas/yr
Parallax (π)	25.4868±0.0207 mas
Distance	128.0 ± 0.1 ly (39.24 ± 0.03 pc)
Absolute magnitude (M_{V})	4.67

Details
Mass	0.974±0.018 M_{☉}
Radius	1.048±0.015 R_{☉}
Luminosity	0.970±0.019 L_{☉}
Surface gravity (log g)	4.386±0.015 cgs
Temperature	5,602±36 K
Metallicity [Fe/H]	0.19±0.01 dex
Rotation	30 days
Age	8.3±1.0 Gyr

Other designations
- BD−10°919, HD 28185, HIP 20723, SAO 149631, GSC 05317-00733

Database references
SIMBAD	data

HD 28185 is a single yellow dwarf star similar to the Sun, located 128 light-years away from Earth in the constellation Eridanus. The designation HD 28185 refers to its entry in the Henry Draper catalogue. The star is known to possess two long-period extrasolar planets.

== Characteristics ==
According to measurements from the Gaia spacecraft, HD 28185 has a parallax of 25.4868 milliarcseconds, which corresponds to a distance of 39.24 parsecs (128.0 light-years). Since the star is located further than 25 parsecs from Earth, it is not listed in the Gliese Catalogue of Nearby Stars. With an apparent magnitude of 7.81, the star is almost never visible with the naked eye, though it can be seen using binoculars.

HD 28185 is similar to the Sun in terms of mass, radius, and luminosity. The spectral type of G6.5IV-V implies HD 28185 is cooler than the Sun, and that the star is on the main sequence and is generating energy by fusing hydrogen in its core. Like the majority of extrasolar planet host stars, HD 28185 is metal-rich relative to the Sun, containing around 173% of the solar abundance of iron. The star rotates slower than the Sun, with a period of around 30 days, compared to 25.4 days for the Sun.

Based on the star's chromospheric activity, HD 28185 is estimated to have an age of around 2,900 million years. On the other hand, evolutionary models give an age of around 7,500 million years and a mass 0.99 times that of the Sun. The higher luminosity and longer rotation period favour an older age for the star. As of 2024, the most recent estimate is about 8,300 million years, based on the star's observed physical properties.

== Planetary system ==
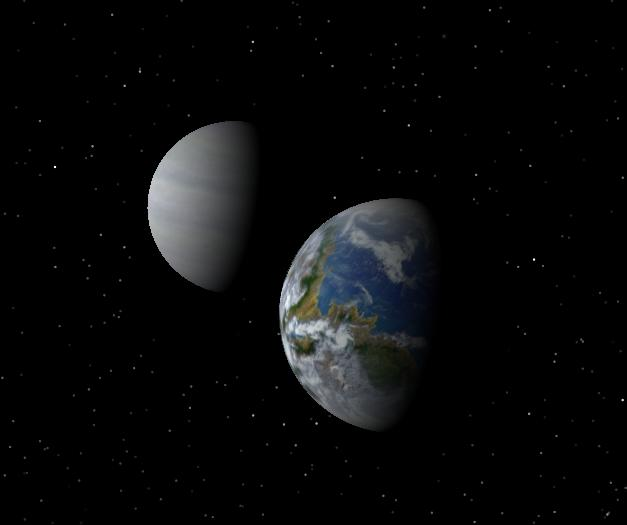
Artist's impression of HD 28185 b and a hypothetical habitable moon

In 2001, an extrasolar planet more massive than Jupiter, designated HD 28185 b, was discovered in orbit around the star with a period of 1.04 years. Unlike many long-period extrasolar planets, it has a low orbital eccentricity. The planet experiences similar insolation to Earth, which has led to speculations about the possibilities for habitable moons. In addition, numerical simulations suggest that low-mass planets located in the gas giant's Trojan points would be stable for long periods. The planet's existence was independently confirmed by the Magellan Planet Search Program in 2008.

The star also shows evidence of a long-term radial velocity trend, which may indicate the presence of an additional outer companion. In 2022, the presence of an outer companion (HD 28185 c) was confirmed using a combination of radial velocity and astrometry, with the proposed mass of nearly 20 times that of Jupiter being in the range of brown dwarfs. However, this was revised by a 2024 follow-up study which found HD 28185 c to be a planet with a mass 6 times that of Jupiter, comparable to HD 28185 b. Also in 2024, the inclination and true mass of HD 28185 b were measured via astrometry.

The HD 28185 planetary system
Companion (in order from star)	Mass	Semimajor axis (AU)	Orbital period (years)	Eccentricity	Inclination (°)	Radius
b	13.3+5.0 −3.9 M_{J}	1.0282+0.0063 −0.0064	1.05642(15)	0.0634±0.0030	156.5+6.1 −9.5	—
c	5.68+0.44 −0.36 M_{J}	8.54+0.21 −0.14	25.27+0.91 −0.61	0.15±0.04	73+10.0 −8.4 or 109.5+9.1 −12.0	—

== See also ==
- 51 Pegasi
- Iota Horologii
