= Theta Mensae =

Star in the constellation Mensa

θ Mensae
- Location of θ Mensae (circled)

Observation data Epoch J2000.0 Equinox J2000.0 (ICRS)
- Constellation: Mensa
- Right ascension: 06^{h} 56^{m} 34.47434^{s}
- Declination: −79° 25′ 12.6918″
- Apparent magnitude (V): 5.45±0.01

Characteristics
- Evolutionary stage: main sequence
- Spectral type: B9.5 V
- U−B color index: −0.07
- B−V color index: +0.05
- Variable type: suspected SPB

Astrometry
| Radial velocity (R_{v}) | 6±7.4 km/s |
| Proper motion (μ) | RA: −2.270 mas/yr Dec.: −1.240 mas/yr |
| Parallax (π) | 8.4632±0.0405 mas |
| Distance | 385 ± 2 ly (118.2 ± 0.6 pc) |
| Absolute magnitude (M_{V}) | +0.28 |

Details
| Mass | 2.87±0.03 M_{☉} |
| Radius | 4.37 R_{☉} |
| Luminosity | 124+8 −6 L_{☉} |
| Surface gravity (log g) | 3.64±0.06 cgs |
| Temperature | 9,938±282 K |
| Rotation | 1.266 d |
| Rotational velocity (v sin i) | 209 km/s |
| Age | 266±4 Myr |

Other designations
- θ Mensae, 42 G. Mensae, CPD−79°238, FK5 2545, GC 9278, HD 54239, HIP 33384, HR 2689, SAO 256355

Database references
| SIMBAD | data |

θ Mensae, Latinized to Theta Mensae, is a star located in the southern circumpolar constellation Mensa. It has an apparent magnitude of 5.45, making it faintly visible to the naked eye if viewed under ideal conditions. Based on parallax measurements from Gaia Data Release 3, the object is estimated to be 385 light years distant. The value is horribly constrained, but it appears to be receding with a heliocentric radial velocity of 6 km/s.

This is a solitary, B-type main-sequence star with a stellar classification of B9.5 V. Houk and Cowley (1975) give it a class of B9.5/A0 III/IV, indicating that it is a B9.5-A0 star with the blended luminosity class of a giant star and a subgiant. Nevertheless, Theta Mensae has 2.87 times the Sun’s mass and an enlarged radius of 4.37 R_{☉}. It radiates 124 solar luminosities from its photosphere and it has an effective temperature of 9,938 K, giving it a bluish-white hue. It is estimated to be 266 million years old, having completed 85.2% of its main sequence lifetime, hence the large radius. Like most hot stars, it spins rapidly, having a projected rotational velocity of 209 km/s.

Data from the Transiting Exoplanet Survey Satellite suggests that Theta Mensae may be a slowly pulsating B-type star plus a variable star with rotation modulations
