= HD 30479 =

Star in the constellation Mensa

Observation data Epoch J2000 Equinox ICRS
- Constellation: Mensa
- Right ascension: 04^{h} 38^{m} 21.7254^{s}
- Declination: −77° 39′ 21.6185″
- Apparent magnitude (V): 6.04 ± 0.01

Characteristics
- Spectral type: K2 III
- U−B color index: +0.95
- B−V color index: +1.10

Astrometry
Radial velocity (R_{v})	10.3 ± 0.1 km/s
Proper motion (μ)	RA: −6.975 mas/yr Dec.: −11.166 mas/yr
Parallax (π)	6.0377±0.0223 mas
Distance	540 ± 2 ly (165.6 ± 0.6 pc)
Absolute magnitude (M_{V})	−0.05

Details
Mass	1.28 M_{☉}
Radius	17.99 R_{☉}
Luminosity	116 L_{☉}
Surface gravity (log g)	2 cgs
Temperature	4,390 K
Metallicity [Fe/H]	−0.15 dex
Rotational velocity (v sin i)	<1 km/s

Other designations
- 13 G. Mensae, CPD−77°181, FK5 2350, GC 5750, HD 30479, HIP 21611, HR 1531, SAO 256116

Database references
SIMBAD	data

HD 30479 (HR 1531) is a solitary star in the southern circumpolar constellation Mensa. It has an apparent magnitude of 6.04, making it barely visible to the naked eye even under ideal conditions. It is located at a distance of 540 light years but is receding with a heliocentric radial velocity of 10.3 km/s.

HD 30479 has a stellar classification of K2 III, indicating that it is an early K-type giant star and has an angular diameter of 1.01±0.07 mas (after limb darkening correction). This yields a radius 17.99 times that of the Sun at its estimated distance. At present it has 1.28 times the mass of the Sun and radiates at 116 times the luminosity of the Sun at an effective temperature of 4,390 K from its enlarged photosphere, which gives it an orange glow. HD 30479 is believed to be one of the metal-deficient members of the young disk population with an iron abundance of 71% that of the Sun. Currently, it spins leisurely with a projected rotational velocity less than 1 km/s, common for giants.
