= Epsilon Mensae =

Star in the constellation Mensa

ε Mensae
- Location of ε Mensae (circled)

Observation data Epoch J2000.0 Equinox J2000.0 (ICRS)
- Constellation: Mensa
- Right ascension: 07^{h} 25^{m} 38.0987^{s}
- Declination: −79° 05′ 39.088″
- Apparent magnitude (V): 5.52±0.01

Characteristics
- Spectral type: K2/3 III
- U−B color index: +1.42
- B−V color index: +1.28

Astrometry
Radial velocity (R_{v})	10.5±2.9 km/s
Proper motion (μ)	RA: −29.197 mas/yr Dec.: +5.181 mas/yr
Parallax (π)	7.1874±0.0449 mas
Distance	454 ± 3 ly (139.1 ± 0.9 pc)
Absolute magnitude (M_{V})	−0.24

Details
Mass	1.15 M_{☉}
Radius	21.94 R_{☉}
Luminosity	170 L_{☉}
Surface gravity (log g)	1.74 cgs
Temperature	4,657±122 K
Metallicity [Fe/H]	−0.31 dex
Rotational velocity (v sin i)	1.8±1.4 km/s
Age	233 Myr

Other designations
- ε Men, 43 G. Mensae, CPD−78°265, FK5 2583, GC 10055, HD 60816, HIP 36039, HR 2919, SAO 256415

Database references
SIMBAD	data

Epsilon Mensae, Latinized to ε Mensae, is a single star in the southern circumpolar constellation Mensa. It has an apparent magnitude of 5.52, making it faintly visible to the naked eye under ideal conditions. The object has a heliocentric radial velocity of 10.5 km/s, meaning it is receding from the Solar System, and is estimated to be 454 light years away.

Epsilon Mensae has a stellar classification of K2/3 III — intermediate between a K2 and K3 giant star. It has 115% the mass of the Sun and an enlarged radius of 21.9 R_{☉}. It shines at 170 times the luminosity of the Sun from its photosphere at an effective temperature of 4,657 K, giving it an orange glow. Epsilon Mensae has a metallicity 49% that of the Sun and is believed to be a member of the young disk population. It spins leisurely with a projected rotational velocity of about 1.8 km/s.
