= HD 219828 b =

Exoplanet that orbits HD 219828 in the constellation of Pegasus

Discovery
- Discovered by: Melo et al.
- Discovery site: Chile
- Discovery date: Feb 18, 2007
- Detection method: radial velocity

Orbital characteristics
- Semi-major axis: 0.052 AU (7,800,000 km)
- Eccentricity: 0.021
- Orbital period (sidereal): 3.8335 ± 0.0013 d
- Time of periastron: 2,453,898.6289 ± 0.072
- Argument of periastron: 0
- Semi-amplitude: 7 ± 50
- Star: HD 219828

HD 219828 b is an extrasolar planet approximately 265 light years away in the constellation of Pegasus. This is a Neptune-mass planet at least 21 times more massive than Earth. The planet's composition is unknown, but it may be similar to the ice giants Uranus and Neptune, or alternatively it may be a mainly rocky like Super-Earth.
