= Iota Mensae =

Star in the constellation Mensa

ι Mensae
- Location of ι Mensae (circled)

Observation data Epoch J2000 Equinox ICRS
- Constellation: Mensa
- Right ascension: 05^{h} 35^{m} 36.1787^{s}
- Declination: −78° 49′ 15.129″
- Apparent magnitude (V): 6.00 - 6.05

Characteristics
- Spectral type: B8 III
- B−V color index: −0.022
- Variable type: Ellipsoidal?

Astrometry
Radial velocity (R_{v})	12.6±4.3 km/s
Proper motion (μ)	RA: +5.547 mas/yr Dec.: +25.710 mas/yr
Parallax (π)	3.7076±0.1819 mas
Distance	880 ± 40 ly (270 ± 10 pc)
Absolute magnitude (M_{V})	−1.03

Details
Mass	3.6 M_{☉}
Radius	9.5 R_{☉}
Luminosity	301 L_{☉}
Surface gravity (log g)	3.4 cgs
Temperature	11,272±264 K
Metallicity [Fe/H]	+0.13 dex
Age	203 Myr

Other designations
- ι Men, CD−78°216, HD 38602, HIP 26264, HR 1991, SAO 256214

Database references
SIMBAD	data

Iota Mensae is a single star about 880 light years away in the faint constellation Mensa. It has a very slightly variable apparent magnitude of 6.0, making it visible with the naked eye under good skies.

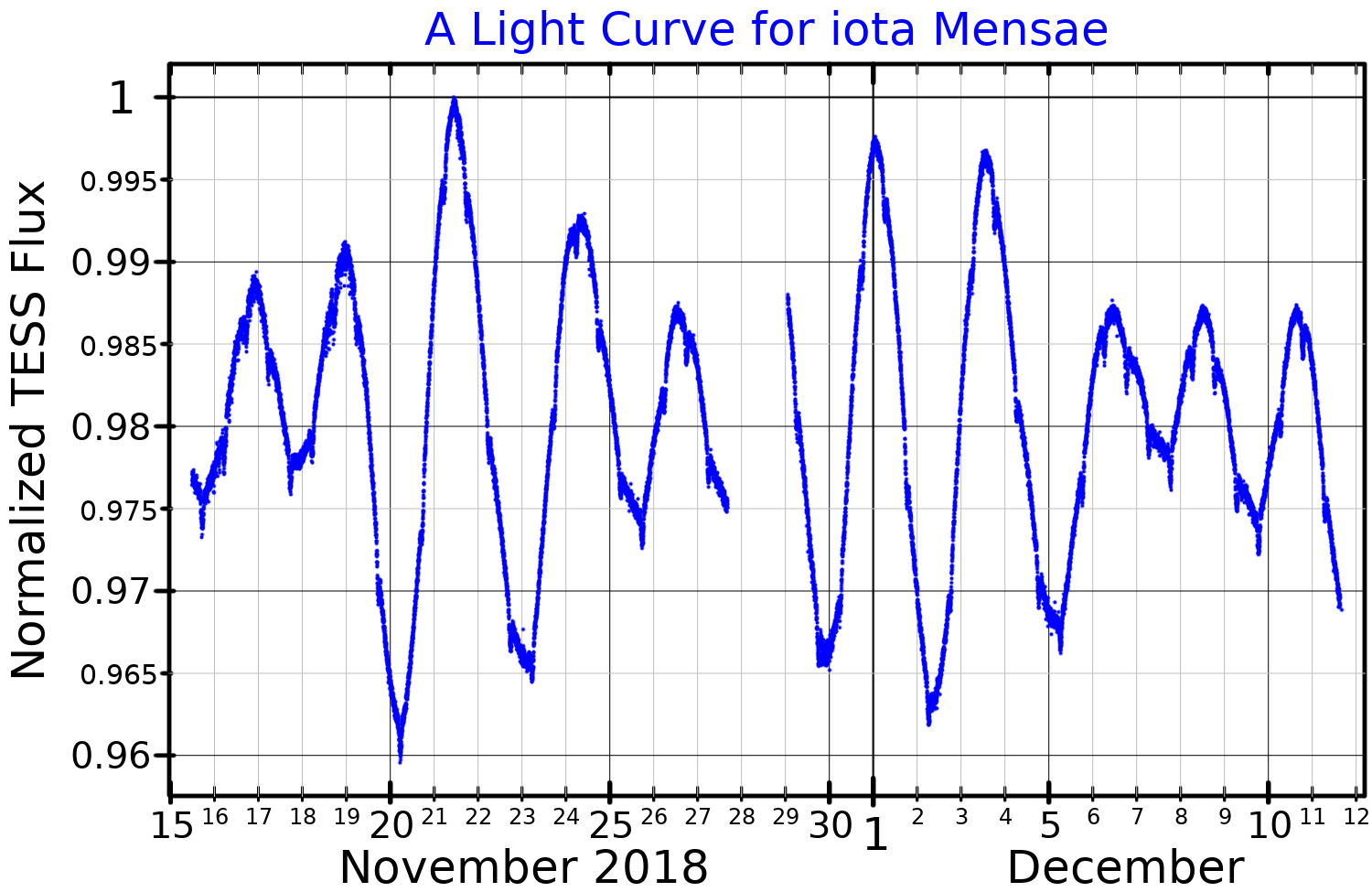
A light curve for Iota Mensae plotted from TESS data

Iota Mensae has a spectral type of B8III, indicating that it has exhausted hydrogen at its core and expanded away from the main sequence. It is about 3.6 times the mass (M_{☉}), 301 times as luminous, and has swollen to 9.5 times the radius of the Sun (R_{☉}). It is calculated to be 314 million years old.

It has been catalogued as a chemically peculiar star with abnormally strong lines of silicon in its spectrum but this classification is now considered doubtful. Its brightness varies by a few hundredths of a magnitude. Its period was initially measured at 2.6 days, but this is now considered to be a period of 5.3 days with primary and secondary minima of a similar depth. The variability is thought to be due to the rotation of the star.
