= HD 31975 =

Star in the constellation Mensa

Observation data Epoch J2000 Equinox ICRS
- Constellation: Mensa
- Right ascension: 04^{h} 53^{m} 05.6446^{s}
- Declination: −72° 24′ 27.6449″
- Apparent magnitude (V): 6.28

Characteristics
- Spectral type: F9 V Fe−0.5
- U−B color index: +0.01
- B−V color index: +0.52

Astrometry
Radial velocity (R_{v})	26.8 ± 0.3 km/s
Proper motion (μ)	RA: −46.178 mas/yr Dec.: +270.916 mas/yr
Parallax (π)	30.8217±0.0217 mas
Distance	105.82 ± 0.07 ly (32.44 ± 0.02 pc)
Absolute magnitude (M_{V})	+3.72

Details
Mass	1.13 M_{☉}
Radius	1.46 R_{☉}
Luminosity	2.77 L_{☉}
Surface gravity (log g)	4.16 cgs
Temperature	6.165 K
Metallicity [Fe/H]	0.00 dex
Rotational velocity (v sin i)	6 km/s
Age	3.5 Gyr

Other designations
- 15 G. Mensae, CD−72°231, CPD−72°332, GC 6031, HD 31975, HIP 22717, HR 1606, SAO 256139, WDS J04531-7225A

Database references
SIMBAD	data

HD 31975 (HR 1606) is a star situated in the southern circumpolar constellation Mensa. It has an apparent magnitude of 6.28, which is near the threshold of naked eye visibility. It is relatively close at a distance of about 106 light years but is receding with a heliocentric radial velocity of 26.9 km/s.

HD 31975 has a stellar classification of F9 V Fe−0.5, indicating that it is a F-type main-sequence star with a mild under abundance of iron in its atmosphere. At present it has 120% the mass of the Sun and 146% the radius of the Sun. It shines at double the luminosity of the Sun from its photosphere at an effective temperature of 6,165 K, giving it a yellow-white glow. HD 31975 has a similar metallicity to the Sun and at an age of 3.5 billion years it spins slowly with a projected rotational velocity of 6 km/s.

The Washington Double Star Catalog lists a faint M5 companion 16.5" away, which is related to the star.
