= Lambda Mensae =

Star in the constellation Mensa

Observation data Epoch J2000.0 Equinox J2000.0 (ICRS)
- Constellation: Mensa
- Right ascension: 05^{h} 47^{m} 48.13340^{s}
- Declination: −72° 42′ 08.0993″
- Apparent magnitude (V): 6.53

Characteristics
- Evolutionary stage: red clump
- Spectral type: K0 III
- Apparent magnitude (B): 7.614
- Apparent magnitude (J): 4.820
- Apparent magnitude (H): 4.163
- Apparent magnitude (K): 4.119
- U−B color index: +0.97
- B−V color index: +1.08

Astrometry
Radial velocity (R_{v})	15.35±0.13 km/s
Proper motion (μ)	RA: -7.013 mas/yr Dec.: +24.451 mas/yr
Parallax (π)	6.9890±0.0139 mas
Distance	466.7 ± 0.9 ly (143.1 ± 0.3 pc)
Absolute magnitude (M_{V})	+0.84

Details
Radius	10 R_{☉}
Luminosity	54 L_{☉}
Surface gravity (log g)	2.43 cgs
Temperature	4,713 K

Other designations
- λ Men, CPD−72°289, HD 39810, HIP 27369, HR 2062, SAO 256239, 2MASS J05474813-7242080

Database references
SIMBAD	data

Lambda Mensae, Latinized from λ Mensae, is an orange-hued star in the southern constellation of Mensa. It has an apparent visual magnitude of 6.53, which places it at or near the limit on stars visible to the naked eye. According to the Bortle scale, it requires a dark night from rural skies for this star to be viewed. Though it has the designation Lambda, it is actually the twenty-fourth-brightest star in the constellation and not the eleventh-brightest.

This is an evolved K-type giant star with a stellar classification of K0 III. It is a red clump star, which means it is generating energy through helium fusion at its core. The measured angular diameter is 0.68±0.01 mas. At an estimated distance of the star, this yields a physical size of about 10 times the radius of the Sun. It is radiating 54 times the Sun's luminosity from its enlarged photosphere at an effective temperature of 4,713 K.
