= HD 35184 =

Star in the constellation Mensa

Observation data Epoch J2000.0 Equinox ICRS
- Constellation: Mensa
- Right ascension: 05^{h} 15^{m} 24.8374^{s}
- Declination: −73° 35′ 18.5123″
- Apparent magnitude (V): 6.50±0.01

Characteristics
- Spectral type: A6 V
- B−V color index: +0.15

Astrometry
Radial velocity (R_{v})	13.6±0.6 km/s
Proper motion (μ)	RA: −22.228 mas/yr Dec.: +5.616 mas/yr
Parallax (π)	8.7050±0.0209 mas
Distance	374.7 ± 0.9 ly (114.9 ± 0.3 pc)
Absolute magnitude (M_{V})	+1.26

Details
Mass	2.15±0.04 M_{☉}
Radius	2.8±0.1 R_{☉}
Luminosity	24.5 L_{☉}
Surface gravity (log g)	3.82^{+0.09}_{−0.07} cgs
Temperature	8,034 K
Metallicity [Fe/H]	−0.01 dex
Rotational velocity (v sin i)	92.4±2.9 km/s
Age	674 Myr

Other designations
- 22 G. Mensae, CPD−73°294, GC 6150, HD 35184, HIP 24507, SAO 256172

Database references
SIMBAD	data

HD 35184 is a solitary star in the southern circumpolar constellation Mensa. It has an apparent magnitude of 6.50, which is at the visibility limit for the average naked eye observer under ideal conditions. Located 375 light years away, it is receding with a heliocentric radial velocity of 13.6 km/s.

HD 35184 has a stellar classification of A6 V, indicating that it is an ordinary A-type main-sequence star. At present it has 2.15 times the mass of the Sun and 2.8 times the radius of the Sun. It shines at 24.5 L_{☉} from its photosphere at an effective temperature of 8,034 K, giving it a white hue. HD 35184 is 674 million years old – 79.6% through its main sequence lifetime – and spins with a projected rotational velocity of 92 km/s^{−1}.
