= Nu Mensae =

Star in the constellation of Mensa

ν Mensae
- Location of ν Mensae (circled)

Observation data Epoch J2000 Equinox J2000
- Constellation: Mensa
- Right ascension: 04^{h} 20^{m} 58.0721^{s}
- Declination: −81° 34′ 47.719″
- Apparent magnitude (V): 5.76±0.01

Characteristics
- Spectral type: F0/2 III
- U−B color index: +0.05
- B−V color index: +0.35

Astrometry
| Radial velocity (R_{v}) | 9.1±2.8 km/s |
| Proper motion (μ) | RA: +10.182 mas/yr Dec.: +125.469 mas/yr |
| Parallax (π) | 18.4754±0.0273 mas |
| Distance | 176.5 ± 0.3 ly (54.13 ± 0.08 pc) |
| Absolute magnitude (M_{V}) | +2.13 |

Details
| Mass | 1.69 M_{☉} |
| Radius | 2.3 R_{☉} |
| Luminosity | 11.5 L_{☉} |
| Surface gravity (log g) | 3.94 cgs |
| Temperature | 6,921±139 K |
| Metallicity [Fe/H] | −0.08 dex |
| Rotational velocity (v sin i) | 108±5 km/s |
| Age | 1.7 Gyr |

Other designations
- ν Mensae, 8 G. Mensae, CPD−81°115, GC 5418, HD 29116, HIP 20297, HR 1456, SAO 258378

Database references
| SIMBAD | data |

Nu Mensae, Latinized from ν Mensae, is a solitary star situated in the southern circumpolar constellation Mensa. It has an apparent magnitude of 5.76, making it faintly visible to the naked eye. The star is relatively close at a distance of 176 light years but is receding with a heliocentric radial velocity of 9.1 km/s.

Nu Mensae has a stellar classification of F0/2 III, indicating that it is a giant star with a spectrum intermediate between that of an F0 and F2 star. The star has an angular diameter of 0.41±0.03 mas, and a radius 2.39 times that of the Sun at its estimated distance. At present it has 169% the mass of the Sun and shines at 11.5 times the luminosity of the Sun at an effective temperature of 6,921 K, giving it a white glow with a yellow tint. Despite an age of 1.7 billion years, Nu Mensae spins rapidly with a projected rotational velocity of 108 km/s and is slightly metal deficient relative to the Sun.
