= HD 23474 =

Double star in the constellation Mensa

Observation data Epoch J2000.0 Equinox J2000.0 (ICRS)
- Constellation: Mensa
- Right ascension: 03^{h} 36^{m} 30.1435^{s}
- Declination: −78° 19′ 23.0623″
- Apparent magnitude (V): 6.30±0.01

Characteristics
- Spectral type: K2 III
- U−B color index: +1.03
- B−V color index: +1.15

Astrometry
Radial velocity (R_{v})	2.4±0.4 km/s
Proper motion (μ)	RA: −14.12 mas/yr Dec.: +6.67 mas/yr
Parallax (π)	4.34±0.36 mas
Distance	750 ± 60 ly (230 ± 20 pc)
Absolute magnitude (M_{V})	−0.50

Details
Mass	1.21 M_{☉}
Radius	33.51±7.44 R_{☉}
Luminosity	227 L_{☉}
Surface gravity (log g)	1.22 cgs
Temperature	4,556 K
Metallicity [Fe/H]	−0.03 dex
Rotational velocity (v sin i)	1.2±1.3 km/s

Other designations
- 3 G. Mensae, CPD−78°105, FK5 2261, GC 4400, HD 23474, HIP 16827, HR 1154, SAO 256005, WDS J03365-7819AB

Database references
SIMBAD	data

HD 23474 (HR 1154) is a double star in the southern circumpolar constellation Mensa. It has an apparent magnitude of 6.30, placing it near the max naked eye visibility. The system is situated at a distance of about 750 light years and is currently receding with a heliocentric radial velocity of 2.4 km/s.

As of 2018, the pair have a separation of 0.2 arcseconds along a position angle of 92°.

The primary or visible component has a stellar classification of K2 III, indicating that it is a red giant. As a result, it has expanded to a diameter of 33.51 R_{☉} and has an effective temperature of 4,556 K, giving an orange hue. It has 121% the mass of the Sun and shines with a luminosity of 227 L_{☉} from its enlarged photosphere. HD 23474 spins with a poorly constrained projected rotational velocity of 1.2 km/s and has a metallicity around solar level.
