= HD 33875 =

Star in the constellation of Mensa

Observation data Epoch J2000 Equinox ICRS
- Constellation: Mensa
- Right ascension: 05^{h} 06^{m} 09.2953^{s}
- Declination: −73° 02′ 15.6159″
- Apparent magnitude (V): 6.26 ± 0.01

Characteristics
- Spectral type: A1 V or A0 V
- U−B color index: −0.01
- B−V color index: +0.01

Astrometry
Radial velocity (R_{v})	8 ± 7.4 km/s
Proper motion (μ)	RA: +17.783 mas/yr Dec.: +63.090 mas/yr
Parallax (π)	7.742±0.0276 mas
Distance	421 ± 2 ly (129.2 ± 0.5 pc)
Absolute magnitude (M_{V})	+0.7

Details
Mass	2.31 ± 0.41 M_{☉}
Radius	2.84 ± 0.35 R_{☉}
Luminosity	49.2 L_{☉}
Surface gravity (log g)	4 cgs
Temperature	9,392 K
Rotational velocity (v sin i)	124 ± 6 km/s
Age	411 Myr

Other designations
- 20 G. Mensae, CD−73°219, CPD−73°286, FK5 2388, GC 6313, HD 33875, HIP 23737, HR 1700, SAO 256160

Database references
SIMBAD	data

HD 33875 (HR 1700) is a solitary star in the southern circumpolar constellation Mensa. With an apparent magnitude of 6.26, it is barely visible to the naked eye under ideal conditions. The star is located at a distance of 421 light years but is receding at a rate of 8 km/s.

HD 33875 is an ordinary A-type main-sequence star with a stellar classification of either A1 V or A0 V depending on the source. At present it has 2.38 times the mass of the Sun and 2.84 times the radius of the Sun. It shines at 49.2 times the Sun's luminosity from its photosphere at an effective temperature of 9,392 K, which gives it a white glow. HD 33875 is a fast rotator, spinning rapidly with a projected rotational velocity of 124 km/s.
