= HD 28185 b =

Gas giant orbiting HD 28185

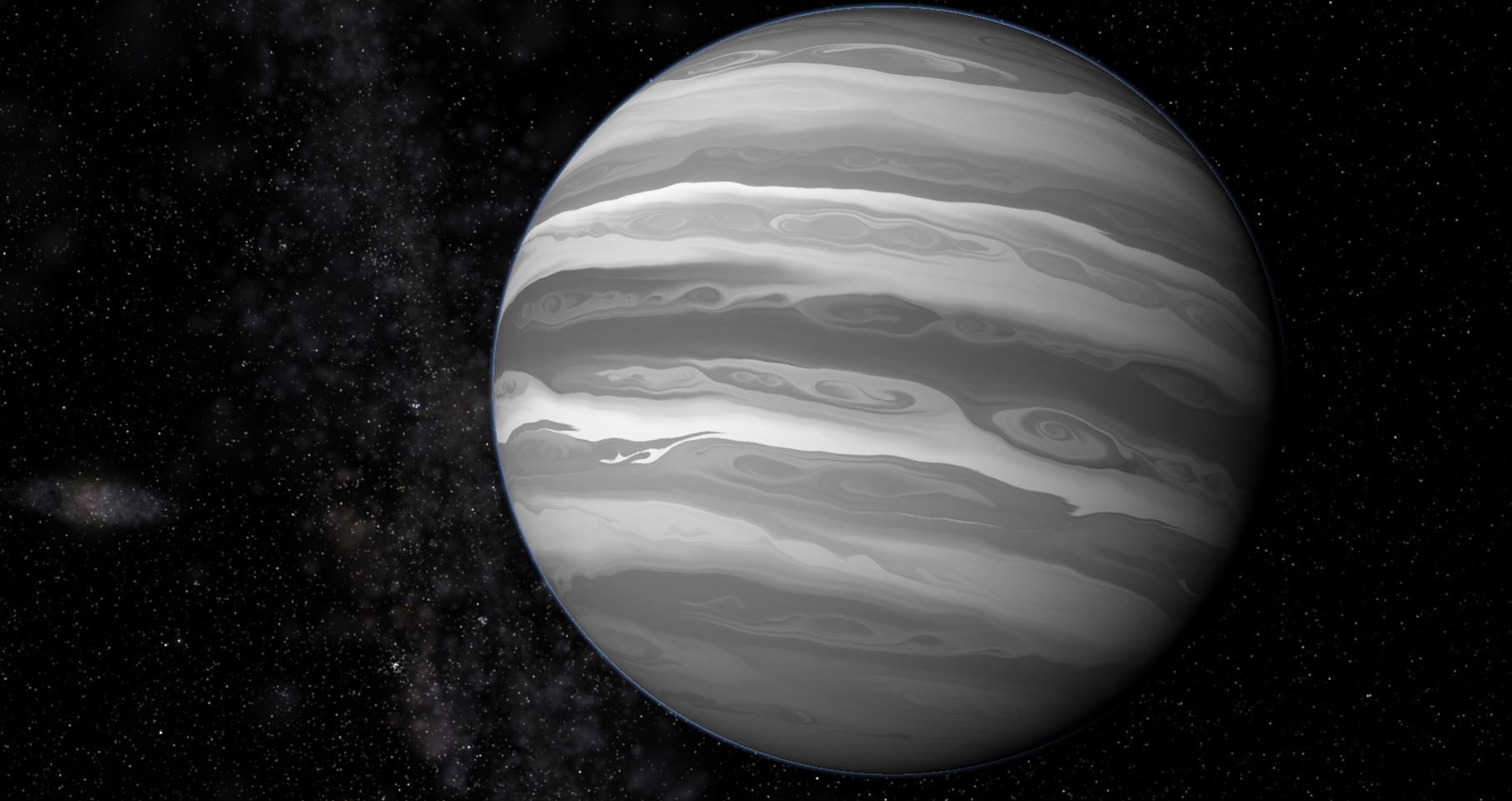
- An artist's impression of HD28185 b

Discovery
- Discovered by: Santos et al.
- Discovery site: La Silla Observatory
- Discovery date: April 4, 2001
- Detection method: Radial velocity (CORALIE)

Orbital characteristics
- Semi-major axis: 1.035+0.042 −0.046 AU
- Eccentricity: 0.055+0.004 −0.003
- Orbital period (sidereal): 1.056 ± 0.0002 years (385.704 ± 0.073 d)
- Inclination: 156.5°+6.1° −9.5°
- Time of periastron: 2452262.394+3.714 −3.315
- Argument of periastron: 356.596°+3.495° −3.155°
- Semi-amplitude: 163.657+0.653 −0.533
- Star: HD 28185

Physical characteristics
- Mass: 13.3+5.0 −3.9 M_{J}

HD 28185 b is an extrasolar planet 128 light-years away from Earth in the constellation of Eridanus. The planet was discovered orbiting the Sun-like star HD 28185 in April 2001 as a part of the CORALIE survey for southern extrasolar planets, and its existence was independently confirmed by the Magellan Planet Search Survey in 2008. HD 28185 b orbits its sun in a circular orbit that is at the inner edge of its star's habitable zone.

== Discovery ==
HD 28185 b was discovered by detecting small periodic variations in the radial velocity of its parent star caused by the gravitational attraction of the planet. This was achieved by measuring the Doppler shift of the star's spectrum. In 2001 it was announced that HD 28185 exhibited a wobble along the line-of-sight with a period of 383 days, with an amplitude indicating a minimum mass 5.72 times that of Jupiter.

== Orbit and mass ==
HD 28185 b takes 1.04 years to orbit its parent star. Unlike most known long-period planets, the orbit of HD 28185 b has a low eccentricity, comparable to that of Mars in the Solar System. The orbit lies entirely within its star's habitable zone.

The amplitude of the radial velocity oscillations means that the planet has a mass at least 5.7 times that of Jupiter. However, the radial velocity method only yields a minimum value on the planet's mass, depending on the orbital inclination to our line-of-sight. Therefore, the true mass of the planet may be much greater than this lower limit. In 2024, the true mass of the planet was revealed to be about 13.3 Jupiter masses via astrometric measurements of the host star.

== Composition and habitability ==
Given the planet's high mass, it is most likely to be a gas giant with no solid surface. Since the planet has only been detected indirectly through observations of the star, properties such as its radius, composition, and temperature are unknown. Periastron (0.959 AU), semimajor axis (1.031 AU) and apastron (1.102 AU) irradiances are 112%, 96.6% and 84.5% that of the Earth. (Note: From $\frac{f}{f_\oplus}=\left(\frac{R_\ast}{R_\odot}\right)^2 \left(\frac{T_\ast}{t_\odot}\right)^4 \left(\frac{d}{\mathrm{1\ AU}}\right)^{-2}$ Star radius is 1.15 times solar, temperature is 5609 K compared to the sun 5777 K. Irradiance is given by bolometric luminosity divided by square of distance, flux divided by Solar Constant, ratio relative to Earth.)

Since HD 28185 b orbits in its star's habitable zone, some have speculated on the possibility of life on worlds in the HD 28185 system. While it is unknown whether gas giants can support life, simulations of tidal interactions suggest that HD 28185 b could harbor Earth-mass satellites in orbit around it for many billions of years. Such moons, if they exist, may be able to provide a habitable environment, though it is unclear whether such satellites would form in the first place. Additionally, a small planet in one of the gas giant's Trojan points could survive in a habitable orbit for long periods. The high mass of HD 28185 b, of over thirteen Jupiter masses, actually makes either of these scenarios more likely than if the planet was about Jupiter's mass or less.

== See also ==
- 51 Pegasi b and Iota Horologii b, both of which orbit Sun-like stars
- Gliese 876 b
- Yavin
- Habitable exomoons
