= Delta Mensae =

Binary star system in the constellation Mensa

Observation data Epoch J2000.0 Equinox J2000.0 (ICRS)
- Constellation: Mensa
- Right ascension: 04^{h} 17^{m} 59.27258^{s}
- Declination: −80° 12′ 50.5073″
- Apparent magnitude (V): 5.69

Characteristics
- Spectral type: K2/3 III + A9
- U−B color index: +0.53
- B−V color index: +0.84

Astrometry
Radial velocity (R_{v})	−20.0±4.3 km/s
Proper motion (μ)	RA: +27.719 mas/yr Dec.: +61.679 mas/yr
Parallax (π)	6.9662±0.1168 mas
Distance	468 ± 8 ly (144 ± 2 pc)
Absolute magnitude (M_{V})	0.34

Details

primary
Radius	13.12+0.52 −0.46 R_{☉}
Luminosity	111.7±2.2 L_{☉}
Temperature	5,180+94 −99 K
Rotational velocity (v sin i)	< 4.7±0.2 km/s

Other designations
- δ Men, CPD−80°116, FK5 166, HD 28525, HIP 20049, HR 1426, SAO 258372

Database references
SIMBAD	data

Delta Mensae, Latinized from δ Mensae, is a binary star system in the southern constellation of Mensa. It is faintly visible to the naked eye, having an apparent visual magnitude of 5.69. Based upon an annual parallax shift of 7.70 mas as seen from the Earth, it is 420 light years from the Sun.

The primary is a K-type giant star with a stellar classification of K2/3 III. With the supply of hydrogen at its core exhausted, it has cooled and expanded to 13 times the radius of the Sun. The star is radiating 112 times the Sun's luminosity from its photosphere at an effective temperature of 5,180 K. Its companion is an A-type star about 0.9 magnitudes fainter than the primary.
