= HD 48265 b =

Exoplanet in the constellation Puppis

HD 48265 b / Naqaỹa
Discovery
- Discovered by: Minniti et al.
- Discovery site: La Silla Observatory
- Discovery date: October 29, 2008
- Detection method: Doppler spectroscopy (CORALIE)

Orbital characteristics
- Semi-major axis: 1.81±0.07 AU
- Eccentricity: 0.08±0.05
- Orbital period (sidereal): 780.3±4.6 d
- Argument of periastron: 344±138
- Semi-amplitude: 27.7±1.2
- Star: HD 48265

HD 48265 b is an extrasolar planet located approximately 293 light-years away in the constellation of Puppis, orbiting the 8th-magnitude G-type main-sequence star HD 48265. It has a minimum mass of 1.47 times that of Jupiter. Because its inclination is not known, its true mass is not known. It orbits at a distance of 1.81 AU with an orbital eccentricity of 0.08.

As part of the NameExoWorlds project of the IAU, HD 48265 b was named Naqaỹa 'brother' and HD 48265 Nosaxa 'springtime' in the Moqoit (Mocoví) language by Argentine respondents to an online poll.
