= HD 129445 b =

Eccentric Jupiter gas giant exoplanet orbiting the star HD 129445

Discovery
- Discovered by: Arriagada et al.
- Discovery site: Las Campanas Observatory
- Discovery date: January 26, 2010
- Detection method: Doppler spectroscopy

Orbital characteristics
- Semi-major axis: 2.984+0.039 −0.054 AU
- Eccentricity: 0.572+0.087 −0.086
- Orbital period (sidereal): 1802+34 −47 d 4.933+0.093 −0.13 yr
- Average orbital speed: 17
- Inclination: 52°+24° −19° or 128°+19° −24°
- Longitude of ascending node: 105°+47° −74°
- Time of periastron: 2456705+57 −77
- Argument of periastron: 163.8°+8.8° −8.9°
- Semi-amplitude: 38 ± 6
- Star: HD 129445

Physical characteristics
- Mass: 2.51+1.1 −0.54 M_{J}

HD 129445 b is an eccentric Jupiter gas giant exoplanet orbiting the star HD 129445 which was discovered by the Magellan Planet Search Program in 2010. Its minimum mass is 1.6 times Jupiter's, and it takes 5 years to complete one orbit around HD 129445, a G-type star approximately 219 light years away. In 2023, the inclination and true mass of HD 129445 b were determined via astrometry.
