= Robert A. Wittenmyer =

Australian astronomer (born 1976)

- Born: April 1, 1976 (age 50); Newport News, Virginia, U.S
- Education: Williams College (BA); Boston University (MA); San Diego State University (MS); University of Texas at Austin (PhD)
- Occupations: Astrophysicist, Astronomer
- Known for: discovery of Gliese 832 c
- Scientific career
- Fields: Astrophysics; Astronomy
- Workplaces: University of New South Wales; University of Southern Queensland

Robert A. Wittenmyer is an American-born Australian astrophysicist and astronomer. He has led the team of researchers who discovered the exoplanet Gliese 832 c. He is the leader of a collaboration between Australian, Chinese, and the US exoplanet search team and also a member of the Anglo-Australian Planet Search. He is currently employed by the University of Southern Queensland located in Toowoomba, Queensland, Australia as an associate professor.

== Discoveries ==
- Nu2 Canis Majoris b
- HD 159868 c
- Gliese 832 c
