= Gliese 777 Ab =

Extrasolar planet in the constellation Cygnus

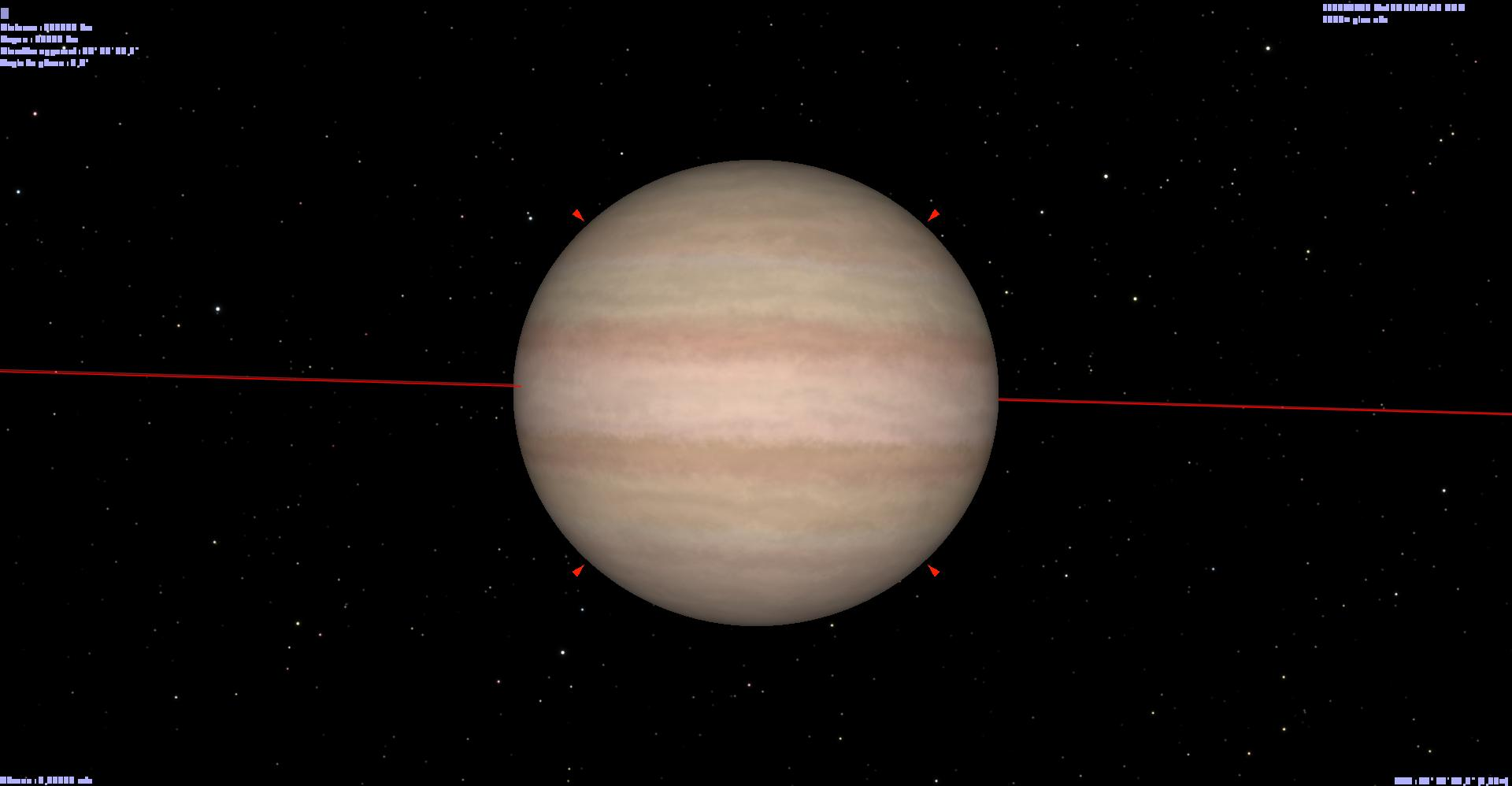

Discovery
- Discovered by: Mayor et al.
- Discovery site: (France) Haute-Provence
- Discovery date: 19 June 2002
- Detection method: Doppler spectroscopy

Orbital characteristics
- Apastron: 5.23 AU (782,000,000 km)
- Periastron: 2.57 AU (384,000,000 km)
- Semi-major axis: 3.9 ± 0.2 AU (583,000,000 ± 30,000,000 km)
- Eccentricity: 0.340±0.018
- Orbital period (sidereal): 7.815 ± 0.035 a (2,854 ± 13 d)
- Mean anomaly: 219.5±4.1
- Inclination: 80.2±23.2
- Longitude of ascending node: 306.6±44.4
- Time of periastron: 2447871±38
- Argument of periastron: 19.9±3.6
- Semi-amplitude: 24.4±0.6
- Star: Gliese 777 A

Physical characteristics
- Mass: 1.68+0.26 −0.16 M_{J}
- Temperature: 121±4 K

Gliese 777 Ab, also known as HD 190360 b, is an extrasolar planet approximately 52 light-years away in the constellation of Cygnus. The planet was discovered orbiting the primary star of the Gliese 777 system in June 2002 (by the Geneva Extrasolar Planet Search Team) using the radial velocity method. The planet is at least one half more massive than Jupiter but roughly the same size as Jupiter. In 2021, the inclination of Gliese 777 Ab was measured via astrometry, allowing the true mass of 1.8 M_{J} to be determined.

The planet has one of the longest orbits currently known for an extrasolar planet. The planet's mean distance from the star is close to the distance between Jupiter and the Sun. However, unlike Jupiter it has an eccentric orbit. At periastron the distance between the planet and the star is only 2.57 AU and at apastron the distance is as much as 5.23 AU (compared to the Solar System, distance from the Sun to the inner asteroid belt and from Sun to just beyond the orbit of Jupiter).

The signal produced by the planet is very weak and the eccentricity was originally supposed to be very circular which led to speculations of a very Jupiter-like planet, with a system of several large moons like Jupiter itself. The inner system should be stable for Earth-like planets despite a known, smaller inner Neptune-like planet which is known to orbit the star at distance of 0.12 AU every 17 Earth days.
