= HD 164604 =

Star in the constellation Sagittarius

HD 164604 / Pincoya
Observation data Epoch J2000 Equinox ICRS
- Constellation: Sagittarius
- Right ascension: 18^{h} 03^{m} 06.93302^{s}
- Declination: –28° 33′ 38.3488″
- Apparent magnitude (V): 9.62

Characteristics
- Evolutionary stage: main sequence
- Spectral type: K3.5V(k)
- Apparent magnitude (B): 11.016
- Apparent magnitude (J): 7.784±0.024
- Apparent magnitude (H): 7.306±0.038
- Apparent magnitude (K): 7.169±0.020
- B−V color index: 1.396±0.491

Astrometry
Radial velocity (R_{v})	7.30±0.16 km/s
Proper motion (μ)	RA: −34.658 mas/yr Dec.: −42.253 mas/yr
Parallax (π)	24.9867±0.0351 mas
Distance	130.5 ± 0.2 ly (40.02 ± 0.06 pc)
Absolute magnitude (M_{V})	6.57

Details
Mass	0.77±0.02 M_{☉}
Radius	0.78±0.02 R_{☉}
Luminosity	0.26±0.01 L_{☉}
Surface gravity (log g)	4.49±0.41 cgs
Temperature	4,663±31 K
Metallicity [Fe/H]	0.12±0.07 dex
Rotation	19±3 d
Age	10.7±3.8 or 1.6±0.7 Gyr

Other designations
- Pincoya, CD–28° 14058, HD 164604, HIP 88414, SAO 186165, PPM 267742

Database references
SIMBAD	data
Exoplanet Archive	data

HD 164604 is a single star in the southern constellation of Sagittarius. It has the proper name Pincoya, as selected in the NameExoWorlds campaign by Chile, during the 100th anniversary of the IAU. Pincoya is a female water spirit from southern Chilean mythology who is said to bring drowned sailors to the Caleuche so that they can live in the afterlife. A 2015 survey ruled out the existence of any stellar companions at projected distances from 13 to 340 astronomical units. It is known to host a single super-Jupiter exoplanet.

This star is invisible to the naked eye with an apparent visual magnitude of 9.62. It is located at a distance of 130.5 light-years from the Sun based on parallax, and is drifting further away with a radial velocity of +7 km/s. The stellar classification of HD 164604 is K3.5V(k), which indicates this is a K-type main-sequence star. The chromosphere is considered very inactive. It is roughly seven billion years old with 77% of the mass and radius of the Sun. The star is radiating 26% of the luminosity of the Sun from its photosphere at an effective temperature of 4,663 K.

== Planetary system ==
A super-Jupiter exoplanet (HD 164604 b, later named Caleuche) was detected by the Magellan Planet Search Program in 2010 based on radial velocity variations of the host star. The orbit of this body does not preclude a hypothetical Earth-mass exoplanet from occupying a dynamically stable orbit within the habitable zone of this star. An astrometric measurement of the planet's inclination and true mass was published in 2022 as part of Gaia DR3.

A second planet was found in 2026 from combined analysis of radial velocity and astrometry. This is another super-Jupiter on a wider orbit. There are two possible orbital solutions, with the outer planet's orbit being either prograde or retrograde to the inner planet's orbit. The retrograde solution is dynamically stable, while the prograde solution may be unstable. Gaia DR4 astrometry should make it possible to determine which solution is correct.

The HD 164604 planetary system
Companion (in order from star)	Mass	Semimajor axis (AU)	Orbital period (days)	Eccentricity	Inclination (°)	Radius
b / Caleuche	13.2+1.8 −1.5 or 8.8+1.9 −1.5 M_{J}	1.362±0.012	653.9+1.5 −1.7	0.479+0.027 −0.021	10.6+1.4 −1.3 or 16.0+3.5 −2.8	—
c	9.5±1.2 or 7.6±1.0 M_{J}	5.556+0.093 −0.10	5387+120 −127	0.196±0.078	8.6+1.3 −1.0 or 169.3+1.3 −1.7	—
