= Gliese 777 =

Binary star in the constellation Cygnus

- Location of Gliese 777 (circled in red)

Observation data Epoch J2000.0 Equinox ICRS
- Constellation: Cygnus
- A
- Right ascension: 20^{h} 03^{m} 37.405^{s}
- Declination: +29° 53′ 48.49″
- Apparent magnitude (V): +5.73
- B
- Right ascension: 20^{h} 03^{m} 26.581^{s}
- Declination: +29° 51′ 59.53″
- Apparent magnitude (V): +14.4

Characteristics

A
- Evolutionary stage: main sequence
- Spectral type: G6IV

B
- Evolutionary stage: main sequence
- Spectral type: M4.5V

Astrometry

A
Radial velocity (R_{v})	−45.34±0.12 km/s
Proper motion (μ)	RA: +683.196 mas/yr Dec.: −525.501 mas/yr
Parallax (π)	62.4865±0.34 mas
Distance	52.2 ± 0.3 ly (16.00 ± 0.09 pc)
Absolute magnitude (M_{V})	+4.73

B
Radial velocity (R_{v})	−44.02±0.40 km/s
Proper motion (μ)	RA: +681.116 mas/yr Dec.: −525.863 mas/yr
Parallax (π)	62.5269±0.0225 mas
Distance	52.16 ± 0.02 ly (15.993 ± 0.006 pc)
Absolute magnitude (M_{V})	+13.3

Details

A
Mass	0.991+0.039 −0.040 M_{☉}
Radius	1.156±0.058 R_{☉}
Luminosity	1.13±0.19 L_{☉}
Surface gravity (log g)	4.16±0.03 cgs
Temperature	5,536±17 K
Metallicity [Fe/H]	0.17±0.04 dex
Rotation	40 days
Rotational velocity (v sin i)	2.8 km/s
Age	4.79 Gyr

B
Mass	0.21 M_{☉}
Radius	0.24 R_{☉}
Luminosity	0.0044 L_{☉}
Surface gravity (log g)	4.84 cgs
Temperature	3.169 K
Metallicity [Fe/H]	0.06 dex
Rotational velocity (v sin i)	7.1 km/s
Age	2.5 Gyr

Other designations
- GJ 777
- A: BD+29°3872, HD 190360, HIP 98767, HR 7670, LHS 3510
- B: G 125-55, LHS 3509

Database references
SIMBAD	A
- B
Exoplanet Archive	data
ARICNS	data
- data2

Gliese 777, also known as HD 190360, is a binary star system approximately 52 light-years (15.9 parsecs) away in the constellation of Cygnus. The system is made up of two stars and possibly a third. Three exoplanets are known to orbit the primary star.

== Stellar components ==
The primary star of the system (catalogued as Gliese 777 A) is a yellow subgiant, a Sun-like star that is ceasing fusing hydrogen in its core. The star is older than the Sun, about 4.79 billion years old. It is 4% less massive than the Sun. It is also rather metal-rich, having about 70% more "metals" (elements heavier than helium) than the Sun, which is typical for stars with extrasolar planets.

The secondary star (Gliese 777 B) is a distant, dim red dwarf star orbiting the primary at a distance of 3,000 astronomical units (0.047 light years). A faint companion has been reported, but not confirmed.

== Planetary system ==
In 2002, a discovery of a long-period, wide-orbiting, planet (Gliese 777 Ab) was announced by the Geneva extrasolar planet search team. The planet was estimated to orbit in a circular path with low orbital eccentricity, but that estimate was increased with later measurements (e=0.36). Initially therefore, the planet was believed to be a true "Jupiter-twin" but was later redefined as being more like an "eccentric Jupiter", with a mass of at least 1.5 times Jupiter and about the same size. In 2021, the true mass of Gliese 777 Ab was measured via astrometry.

In 2005, further observation of the star showed another amplitude with a period of 17.1 days. The mass of this second planet (Gliese 777 Ac) was only 18 times more than Earth, or about the same as Neptune, indicating it was one of the smallest planets discovered at the time. Initially thought to be on a circular orbital path (e = 0.01), Gliese 777 c was revealed to have a more eccentric orbit with later measurements.

Evidence for a third candidate planet with an orbital period around 89 days was presented in 2025. It was confirmed in 2026.

The HD 190360 (Gliese 777 A) planetary system
Companion (in order from star)	Mass	Semimajor axis (AU)	Orbital period (years)	Eccentricity	Inclination (°)	Radius
c	26.1+25.7 −4.1 M_{🜨}	0.1296+0.0017 −0.0018	0.0468627(11) (17.12 d)	0.163+0.020 −0.019	95+46 −51	—
d	≥10.23+0.81 −0.80 M_{🜨}	0.3886±0.0046	0.2430±0.0001	0.058+0.062 −0.040	—	—
b	1.68+0.26 −0.16 M_{J}	3.965±0.047	7.906±0.010	0.3342+0.0061 −0.0062	69+42 −17	—

There was a METI message sent to Gliese 777. It was transmitted from Eurasia's largest radar, 70-meter Eupatoria Planetary Radar. The message was named Cosmic Call 1; it was sent on July 1, 1999, and it will arrive at Gliese 777 in April 2051.

== See also ==
- 47 Ursae Majoris
- 51 Pegasi
- Gliese 229
