= HD 86226 b =

Gas giant

Discovery
- Discovered by: Arriagada et al.
- Discovery site: Las Campanas Observatory
- Discovery date: January 26, 2010
- Detection method: Doppler spectroscopy

Orbital characteristics
- Semi-major axis: 2.73 ± 0.06 AU (408,400,000 ± 9,000,000 km)
- Eccentricity: 0.059^{+0.062}_{−0.039}
- Orbital period (sidereal): 1628^{+22}_{−21} d
- Time of periastron: 2454821 ± 288
- Star: HD 86226

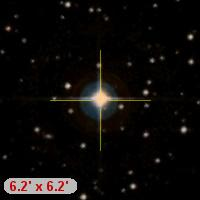

HD 86226 b is a gas giant exoplanet discovered by the Magellan Planet Search Program in 2010. It was confirmed in data collected by the CORALIE spectrograph on the Swiss 1.2-metre Leonhard Euler Telescope in 2012. It takes about 4.6 years to orbit its G-type star and was initially believed to have a minimal mass of 0.92 Jupiters. Discovery of the second planet in the system has led to the revised mass of HD 86226 b in 2020, now estimated to be 0.45^{+0.04}_{−0.05}M_{J}.

== See also ==
- List of exoplanets discovered in 2010
