= Magellan Planet Search Program =

Ground-based search for extrasolar planets

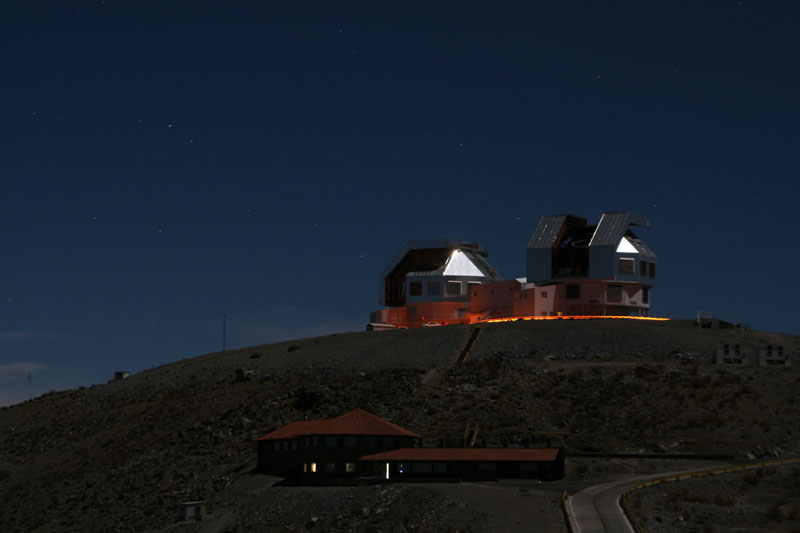
- The Magellan Telescopes at the Las Campanas Observatory
- Alternative names: MPSP
- Coordinates: 29°00′54″S 70°41′32″W

The Magellan Planet Search Program is a ground-based search for extrasolar planets that makes use of the radial velocity method. It began gathering data in December 2002 using the MIKE echelle spectrograph mounted on the 6.5m Magellan II "Clay" telescope located within the Las Campanas Observatory in Chile. In 2010, the program began using the newly commissioned Planet Finder Spectrograph (PFS), an instrument purpose-built for precise radial velocity measurement.

== Specifications ==
The Magellan Planet Search uses a molecular Iodine absorption cell to imprint a set of extremely well known absorption lines onto each stellar spectrum that act as a fiducial wavelength reference. In the early years of the program, MIKE spectra were collected with a resolving power, R, of about 65,000 and achieved velocity precision of several meters per second. Using PFS, most spectra are collected with a resolving power of about 80,000 and velocity precision closer to one meter per second.

== Observations ==
The program has surveyed approximately 500 stars with spectral types ranging from F7 to M5. Stars included in the program were initially chosen to minimize overlap with two complementary surveys: the Anglo-Australian Planet Search (AAT) and the Keck Hi-Res planet search. The Magellan Planet Search has discovered a number of extrasolar planets using MIKE data alone, PFS data alone, a combination of the two, and a combination of these and data collected using other telescopes and instruments. For example, an early announcement was made in January 2010 regarding the discovery of five long period, Jovian mass planets in eccentric orbits around G and K type dwarfs.

=== Extrasolar planets discovered ===
As of June 2026, the program had announced the following discoveries:

- Naqaỹa
- HD 86226 b
- HD 129445 b
- HD 143361 b
- HD 152079 b
- Caleuche
- HD 175167 b
- HD 28185 b
- HD 111232 b
- HD 106906 b
