= HD 152079 =

Star in the constellation Ara

Observation data Epoch J2000.0 Equinox ICRS
- Constellation: Ara
- Right ascension: 16^{h} 53^{m} 05.755^{s}
- Declination: −46° 19′ 58.64″
- Apparent magnitude (V): 9.18

Characteristics
- Spectral type: G6V
- Apparent magnitude (B): 9.891
- Apparent magnitude (J): 7.984±0.021
- Apparent magnitude (H): 7.656±0.031
- Apparent magnitude (K): 7.634±0.021
- B−V color index: 0.711±0.025

Astrometry
Radial velocity (R_{v})	−21.338±0.0007 km/s
Proper motion (μ)	RA: −107.358 mas/yr Dec.: −93.597 mas/yr
Parallax (π)	11.3545±0.0142 mas
Distance	287.2 ± 0.4 ly (88.1 ± 0.1 pc)
Absolute magnitude (M_{V})	4.62

Details
Mass	1.147±0.030 M_{☉}
Radius	1.128±0.074 R_{☉}
Luminosity	1.443 L_{☉}
Surface gravity (log g)	4.365±0.054 cgs
Temperature	5,907±52 K
Metallicity [Fe/H]	0.29±0.07 dex
Rotational velocity (v sin i)	2.6 km/s
Age	6.2 Gyr; 1.622±1.369 Gyr

Other designations
- CD−46°11085, HIP 82632, SAO 227350, PPM 322323

Database references
SIMBAD	data
Exoplanet Archive	data

HD 152079 is a star with an orbiting exoplanet in the southern constellation of Ara. It is located at a distance of 287 light years from the Sun based on parallax measurements, but is drifting closer with a radial velocity of −21 km/s. At that distance the star is much too faint to be visible with the naked eye, having an apparent visual magnitude of 9.18.

This is a G-type main-sequence star with a stellar classification of G6V. Age estimates range from 1.6 to 6.2 billion years. It has 1.15 times the mass of the Sun and 1.13 times the Sun's girth. This is a metal-rich star, having a higher iron abundance than in the Sun. The star is radiating 1.44 times the luminosity of the Sun from its photosphere at an effective temperature of 5,907 K.

== Planetary system ==
It has one confirmed exoplanet, discovered in 2010 by the Magellan Planet Search Program. This is a super-jovian object with an eccentric orbit and a 8.0 yr orbital period. In 2018, an analysis of HARPS data suggested the presence of an additional outer companion with a mass at least 83% of the mass of Jupiter.

The HD 152079 planetary system
Companion (in order from star)	Mass	Semimajor axis (AU)	Orbital period (days)	Eccentricity	Inclination (°)	Radius
b	≥ 2.661±0.046 M_{J}	4.187^{+0.051}_{−0.053}	2,918.92^{+37.87}_{−39.28}	0.532^{+0.015}_{−0.016}	—	—
