= HD 179949 b =

Extrasolar planet that orbits the star HD 179949

HD 179949 b / Mastika
Discovery
- Discovered by: Tinney et al.
- Discovery site: Anglo-Australian; Observatory
- Discovery date: Dec 3, 2000
- Detection method: Radial velocity

Orbital characteristics
- Semi-major axis: 0.0443 ± 0.0026 AU (6,630,000 ± 390,000 km)
- Eccentricity: 0.022±0.015
- Orbital period (sidereal): 3.092514±0.000032 d
- Inclination: 67.7±4.3
- Time of periastron: 2,451,002.32±0.44
- Argument of periastron: 192
- Semi-amplitude: 112.6±1.8
- Star: HD 179949

Physical characteristics
- Mass: 0.98±0.077 M_{J}

HD 179949 b, formally named Mastika, is an extrasolar planet discovered by the Anglo-Australian Planet Search at the Anglo-Australian Observatory, which orbits the star HD 179949. The planet is a so-called "hot Jupiter", a Jupiter-mass planet orbiting very close to its parent star. In this case, orbital distance is almost one-tenth that of Mercury from the Sun. One orbital revolution lasts only about 3 days.

HD 179949 b is a candidate for "near-infrared characterisation.... with the VLTI Spectro-Imager".

== Naming ==
HD 179949 b is named Mastika. The name was selected in the NameExoWorlds campaign by Brunei, during the 100th anniversary of the IAU. Mastika is a Malay word which means 'a gem, precious stone, jewel or the prettiest, the most beautiful'.

== Host star ==
Its magnetic field induces a bright spot on its star at 30 degrees latitude, which rotates at 87 degrees inclination. If the planet orbited at 83-97 degrees, then its transit would be visible from Earth. The angle of inclination is therefore 83 degrees or less, but not much less; and its mass is about 0.92 Jupiter masses M_{J}. The star is not tidally locked to the planet.

== Properties ==
Assuming the planet is perfectly grey with no greenhouse or tidal effects, and a Bond albedo of 0.1, the temperature would be 1533 K. This is, like Tau Boötis b, hotter than the predicted temperature of HD 209458 b (1392K), and close to that of HD 149026 b, before they were measured.

Searches for water in the planet's atmosphere have been inconclusive at first, as have attempts to determine whether titanium and vanadium oxides are present. In the meantime, both carbon monoxide and water have been found in the dayside emission of HD 179949b.

The light reflected off the planet could not be detected in 2021, implying HD 179949 b has a low albedo.

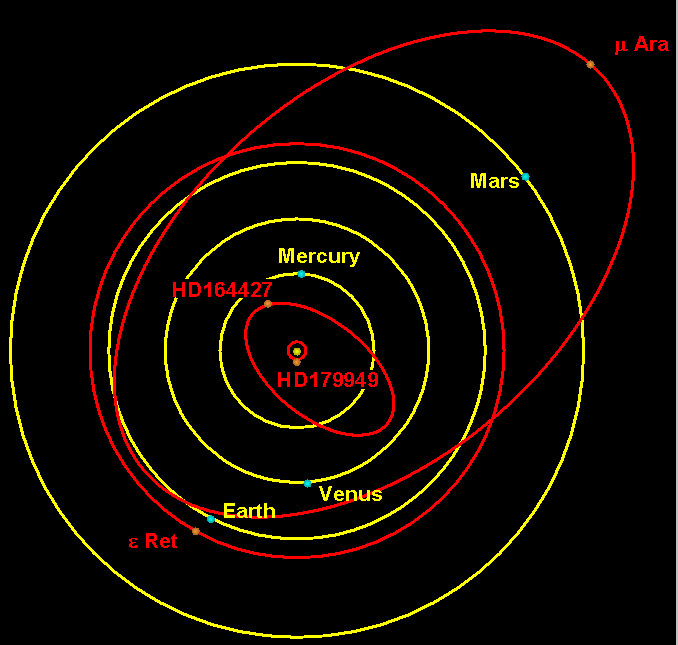
The inner Solar System superimposed behind the orbits of the planets HD 179949 b, HD 164427 b, Epsilon Reticuli Ab, and Mu Arae b (each planet has its parent star labeled next to it -- all parent stars are in the center)
