= HD 142 =

Wide binary star system in the constellation Phoenix

- Location of HD 142 (circled in red)

Observation data Epoch J2000 Equinox ICRS
- Constellation: Phoenix
- HD 142 A
- Right ascension: 00^{h} 06^{m} 19.17532^{s}
- Declination: −49° 04′ 30.6712″
- Apparent magnitude (V): 5.711±0.003
- HD 142 B
- Right ascension: 00^{h} 06^{m} 19.14790^{s}
- Declination: −49° 04′ 34.9098″
- Apparent magnitude (V): +11.5

Characteristics
- Evolutionary stage: main sequence
- Spectral type: F7V + K8.5-M1.5
- B−V color index: 0.519±0.011

Astrometry
Absolute magnitude (M_{V})	+3.65

HD 142 A
Radial velocity (R_{v})	+5.76±0.12 km/s
Proper motion (μ)	RA: +575.099 mas/yr Dec.: −40.874 mas/yr
Parallax (π)	38.1945±0.0355 mas
Distance	85.39 ± 0.08 ly (26.18 ± 0.02 pc)

HD 142 B
Proper motion (μ)	RA: +566.984 mas/yr Dec.: −17.387 mas/yr
Parallax (π)	38.2306±0.0349 mas
Distance	85.31 ± 0.08 ly (26.16 ± 0.02 pc)

Details

HD 142 A
Mass	1.25±0.01 M_{☉}
Radius	1.41±0.11 R_{☉}
Luminosity	2.9 L_{☉}
Surface gravity (log g)	4.45±0.07 cgs
Temperature	6,349±26 K
Metallicity [Fe/H]	+0.133±0.020 dex
Rotation	27.15 days
Rotational velocity (v sin i)	9.58±0.74 km/s
Age	2.50+0.32 −0.28 Gyr

HD 142 B
Mass	0.643 M_{☉}
Radius	0.423 R_{☉}
Luminosity	0.046 L_{☉}
Surface gravity (log g)	4.99 cgs
Temperature	4,110 K

Other designations
- CD−49°14337, HD 142, HIP 522, WDS J00063-4905
- HD 142A: HR 6, SAO 214963
- HD 142B: NLTT 218, 2MASS J00061919-4904348

Database references
SIMBAD	A
- B
Exoplanet Archive	data
ARICNS	data

HD 142 is a wide binary star system in the southern constellation of Phoenix. The main component has a yellow-white hue and is dimly visible to the naked eye with an apparent visual magnitude of 5.7. The system is located at a distance of 85.5 light years from the Sun based on parallax measurements, and is drifting further away with a radial velocity of +6 km/s.

The primary component is an F-type main-sequence star with a stellar classification of F7V, which indicates it is undergoing core hydrogen fusion. It is an estimated 2.5 billion years old and is spinning with a projected rotational velocity of 10 km/s. The star has 1.25 times the mass of the Sun and 1.4 times the Sun's radius. It is radiating 2.9 times the luminosity of the Sun from its photosphere at an effective temperature of 6,349 K.

A magnitude 11.5 companion star was detected in 1894 making this a binary star system. The binary companion was confirmed to be gravitationally bound in 2007 and determined to be a red dwarf of spectral type K8.5-M1.5 with 54% of the Sun's mass. The pair have a projected separation of 120.6 AU.

== Planetary system ==
In 2001, the Anglo-Australian Planet Search team led by Chris Tinney announced the discovery of an extrasolar planet orbiting the primary star. An additional linear trend in the radial velocity data was noticed in 2006 that could have been due to another planet or to the stellar companion. In 2012, additional measurements allowed the detection of a second planet. A third possible planet with a period of 108 days was seen in the data, but with a false alarm probability of five percent. Another paper by the same team updated the parameters for b and c but did not mention the possible planet d.

An astrometric measurement of HD 142 b's inclination and true mass was published in 2022 as part of Gaia DR3. Another 2022 study determined the inclination and true mass of planet c, and confirmed the existence of planet d.

The HD 142 A planetary system
Companion (in order from star)	Mass	Semimajor axis (AU)	Orbital period (days)	Eccentricity	Inclination (°)	Radius
d	≥0.260+0.032 −0.036 M_{J}	0.474+0.021 −0.023	108.5±0.1	0.130+0.103 −0.085	—	—
b	7.1±1.0 M_{J}	1.039+0.046 −0.051	351.4±0.4	0.158+0.033 −0.030	59±7	—
c	10.9+1.3 −0.9 M_{J}	9.8±0.5	10,200+400 −300	0.277+0.026 −0.027	90+11 −12	—

== See also ==
- List of extrasolar planets
