= HD 183263 b =

Extrasolar planet in the constellation Aquila

Discovery
- Discovered by: Marcy et al.
- Discovery site: Keck Observatory, Hawaii, USA
- Discovery date: January 25, 2005
- Detection method: Doppler spectroscopy

Orbital characteristics
- Semi-major axis: 1.486±0.023 AU
- Eccentricity: 0.3728±0.0065
- Orbital period (sidereal): 625.10±0.34 d
- Time of periastron: 2452113.0±2.4
- Argument of periastron: 232.9±1.4
- Semi-amplitude: 86.16±0.79
- Star: HD 183263

HD 183263 b is an extrasolar planet orbiting the star HD 183263. This planet has a minimum mass of 3.6 times more than Jupiter and takes 625 days to orbit the star. The planet was discovered on January 25, 2005 using multiple Doppler measurements of five nearby FGK main-sequence stars and subgiants obtained during the past 4–6 years at the Keck Observatory in Mauna Kea, Hawaii. These stars, namely, HD 183263, HD 117207, HD 188015, HD 45350, and HD 99492, all exhibit coherent variations in their Doppler shifts consistent with a planet in Keplerian motion, and the results were published in a paper by Geoffrey Marcy et al. Photometric observations were acquired for four of the five host stars with an automatic telescope at Fairborn Observatory. The lack of brightness variations in phase with the radial velocities supports planetary-reflex motion as the cause of the velocity variations. An additional planet in the system was discovered later.

== See also ==
- HD 183263 c
