= Tau Gruis =

The Bayer designation Tau Gruis (τ Gru / τ Gruis) is shared by two stars and a star system, in the constellation Grus:

- τ^{1} Gruis (HD 216435)
- τ^{2} Gruis (HD 216656)
- τ^{3} Gruis (HD 216823)

== See also ==
- τ^{1} Gruis b
