= Epsilon Reticuli b =

Extrasolar planet in the constellation Reticulum

Discovery
- Discovered by: Butler, Tinney, Marcy et al.
- Discovery site: Anglo-Australian; Observatory
- Discovery date: December 16, 2000
- Detection method: Radial velocity

Orbital characteristics
- Semi-major axis: 1.271 ± 0.073 AU (190.1 ± 10.9 million km)
- Eccentricity: 0.060 ± 0.043
- Orbital period (sidereal): 428.1 ± 1.1 d
- Time of periastron: 2,451,963 ± 55
- Argument of periastron: 216
- Semi-amplitude: 32.2 ± 1.4
- Star: Epsilon Reticuli

Physical characteristics
- Mass: ≥1.56 ± 0.14 M_{J}

Epsilon Reticuli b, sometimes designated Epsilon Reticuli Ab to distinguish from the white dwarf companion of the primary star Epsilon Reticuli, also known as HD 27442, is an exoplanet which was discovered on December 16, 2000 by the Anglo-Australian Planet Search Team using the radial velocity method. The planet's mass is at least 56% greater than Jupiter mass, a more accurate estimate requiring its inclination to be known.

The planet orbits its parent star relatively close, and with more than twice the eccentricity of Earth's orbit. Based on its mass, it is almost certainly a gas giant.
