= HD 101930 =

Star in the constellation Centaurus

Observation data Epoch J2000 Equinox ICRS
- Constellation: Centaurus
- Right ascension: 11^{h} 43^{m} 30.11338^{s}
- Declination: −58° 00′ 24.7787″
- Apparent magnitude (V): 8.21

Characteristics
- Evolutionary stage: main sequence
- Spectral type: K2 V+
- B−V color index: +0.91

Astrometry
Radial velocity (R_{v})	+18.36 km/s
Proper motion (μ)	RA: +16.680 mas/yr Dec.: +349.125 mas/yr
Parallax (π)	33.3814±0.0180 mas
Distance	97.71 ± 0.05 ly (29.96 ± 0.02 pc)
Absolute magnitude (M_{V})	+5.88

Details
Radius	0.87^{+0.05}_{−0.04} R_{☉}
Luminosity	0.43±0.01 L_{☉}
Surface gravity (log g)	4.40±0.11 cgs
Temperature	5,079±62 K
Metallicity [Fe/H]	+0.1±0.03 dex
Rotational velocity (v sin i)	2 km/s
Age	5.4±4.4 Gyr

Other designations
- CD−57°4096, GJ 3683, HIP 57172, LTT 4350, NLTT 28356, SAO 239322

Database references
SIMBAD	data
ARICNS	data

HD 101930, also known as GJ 3683, is an orange hued star with an orbiting exoplanet located in the southern constellation Centaurus. It has an apparent magnitude of 8.21, making it faintly visible in binoculars but not to the naked eye. The system is located relatively close at a distance of 98 light years but is receding with a heliocentric radial velocity of 18.4 km/s. It has a relatively large proper motion, traversing the celestial sphere with an angular velocity of 0.320″·yr^{−1}.

== Description ==
HD 101930 has a stellar classification of K2 V+, indicating that it is an ordinary K-type main-sequence star. It has an estimated age of 5.4 billion years, which is slightly older than the Sun. The object has 87% the radius of the Sun and an effective temperature of 5,079 K. When combined, these parameters yield a luminosity 43% that of the Sun from its photosphere. As expected with planetary hosts, HD 101930 is metal enriched, having a metallicity 26% above solar levels. The star's projected rotational velocity is similar to the Sun's, having a value of 2 km/s.

A 2007 multicity survey found a co-moving companion located 73″ away, making it a binary star. It has a class of M0-1 and a mass of 0.7 M_{☉}.

== Planetary system ==
In 2005, the discovery of an exoplanet orbiting the star was announced. This is another discovery using the radial velocity method with the HARPS spectrograph. As the inclination of the orbital plane is unknown, only a lower bound on the mass can be determined. It has at least 30% of the mass of Jupiter.

The HD 101930 planetary system
Companion (in order from star)	Mass	Semimajor axis (AU)	Orbital period (days)	Eccentricity	Inclination (°)	Radius
b	≥ 0.30 M_{J}	0.302	70.46 ± 0.18	0.11 ± 0.02	—	—

== See also ==
- HD 93083
- HD 102117
- List of extrasolar planets
- HARPS spectrograph
