= HD 117618 =

Star in the Centaurus constellation

HD 117618 / Dofida
Observation data Epoch J2000 Equinox ICRS
- Constellation: Centaurus
- Right ascension: 13^{h} 32^{m} 25.55562^{s}
- Declination: −47° 16′ 16.9132″
- Apparent magnitude (V): 7.17

Characteristics
- Evolutionary stage: main sequence
- Spectral type: G0 V
- B−V color index: 0.603±0.010

Astrometry
Radial velocity (R_{v})	+1.60±0.76 km/s
Proper motion (μ)	RA: +25.214 mas/yr Dec.: −125.428 mas/yr
Parallax (π)	26.5429±0.0214 mas
Distance	122.88 ± 0.10 ly (37.67 ± 0.03 pc)
Absolute magnitude (M_{V})	4.27

Details
Mass	1.10±0.02 M_{☉}
Radius	1.17±0.04 R_{☉}
Luminosity	1.6±0.1 L_{☉}
Surface gravity (log g)	4.34±0.03 cgs
Temperature	6,019±50 K
Metallicity [Fe/H]	+0.03±0.01 dex
Rotational velocity (v sin i)	3.67 km/s
Age	4.0±1.3 Gyr

Other designations
- Dofida, CD−46°8708, GC 18290, HD 117618, HIP 66047, SAO 224228

Database references
SIMBAD	data
Exoplanet Archive	data

HD 117618, named Dofida by the IAU, is a single, yellow-hued star in the southern constellation of Centaurus. With an apparent visual magnitude of 7.17, it is too faint to be visible to the naked eyes of a typical observer. The distance to this star, as determined from its annual parallax shift of 26.54 mas as seen from Earth's orbit, is 123 light years. It is moving further away with a heliocentric radial velocity of around +1.6 km/s.

This star is similar to the Sun, being a G-type main-sequence star with a stellar classification of G0 V. It is about 10% more massive and 17% larger than the Sun, with an estimated age of roughly four billion years and a projected rotational velocity of 3.67 km/s. The star is radiating 1.6 times the Sun's luminosity from its photosphere at an effective temperature of 6,019 K.

== Name ==
HD 117618, and its planet HD 117618b, were chosen as part of the 2019 NameExoWorlds campaign organised by the International Astronomical Union, which assigned each country a star and planet to be named. HD 117618 was assigned to Indonesia. The winning proposal named the star "Dofida" meaning our star in Nias language, and its planet "Noifasui" meaning revolve around in Nias language (derived from the word ifasui, meaning to revolve around, and no, indicating that the action occurred in the past and continued to the present time).

== Planetary system ==
In 2005, the Anglo-Australian Planet Search program announced the discovery of a low-mass planet in orbit around HD 117618. This object was found through measurements of radial velocity variation, which were larger than those produced by the intrinsic jitter of the host star. The best Keplerian fit to the data gave a periodicity of 25.8 days with an eccentricity of around 0.37 and a semimajor axis of 0.17 AU. The lower bound on the object's mass was estimated to be 0.16 M_{J}. These values were subsequently refined, as shown in the table below.

The HD 117618 planetary system
Companion (in order from star)	Mass	Semimajor axis (AU)	Orbital period (days)	Eccentricity	Inclination (°)	Radius
b / Noifasui	>0.178 ± 0.021 M_{J}	0.176 ± 0.010	25.827±0.019	0.42 ± 0.17	—	—

== See also ==
- HD 117207
- List of extrasolar planets
