= HD 179949 =

Star in the constellation Sagittarius

HD 179949 / Gumala
- Location of HD 179949 (circled in red)

Observation data Epoch J2000 Equinox ICRS
- Constellation: Sagittarius
- Right ascension: 19^{h} 15^{m} 33.2301^{s}
- Declination: −24° 10′ 45.671″
- Apparent magnitude (V): 6.25

Characteristics
- Evolutionary stage: main sequence
- Spectral type: F8 V
- B−V color index: 0.548±0.009

Astrometry
Radial velocity (R_{v})	−24.56±0.08 km/s
Proper motion (μ)	RA: 118.567(30) mas/yr Dec.: −102.364(22) mas/yr
Parallax (π)	36.3115±0.0375 mas
Distance	89.82 ± 0.09 ly (27.54 ± 0.03 pc)
Absolute magnitude (M_{V})	4.05

Details
Mass	1.23±0.01 M_{☉}
Radius	1.2±0.01 R_{☉}
Luminosity	1.95±0.01 L_{☉}
Surface gravity (log g)	4.36±0.01 cgs
Temperature	6,220±28 K
Metallicity [Fe/H]	+0.21 dex
Rotational velocity (v sin i)	6.84 km/s
Age	1.20±0.60 Gyr

Other designations
- Gumala, V5652 Sgr, CD−24° 15161, GJ 749, HD 179949, HIP 94645, HR 7291, SAO 187883

Database references
SIMBAD	data
Exoplanet Archive	data

HD 179949 is a 6th magnitude star in the constellation of Sagittarius. It is a yellow-white dwarf (spectral class F8 V), a type of star hotter and more luminous than the Sun. The star is located about 90 light-years from Earth and might be visible under exceptionally good conditions to an experienced observer without technical aid; usually binoculars are needed.

The star HD 179949 is named Gumala. The name was selected in the NameExoWorlds campaign by Brunei, during the 100th anniversary of the IAU. Gumala is a Malay word, which means a magic bezoar stone found in snakes, dragons, etc.

== Properties ==
This is an F-type main-sequence star classified with a spectral type of F8V. It has an estimated mass of 1.23 times the solar mass and a radius of 1.20 times the solar radius. Its photosphere is shining with 1.95 times the solar luminosity at an effective temperature of 6,220 K. Its metallicity, the abundance of elements other than hydrogen and helium, is high, with 162% the solar iron abundance, following the trend that stars with giant planets are more metal-rich.

With an estimated age of 1.2 billion years, HD 179949 is a chromospherically active star and has a complex magnetic field with a maximum strength of 10 G. Like the Sun, this star has differential rotation, with the equatorial region having a faster rotation period, of 7.62 ± 0.07 days, compared to a rotation period of 10.3 ± 0.8 days in the poles. The star's projected rotational velocity is 7.0 km/s, corresponding to an inclination angle of about 60°. HD 179949 has been classified as a BY Draconis variable, which varies in brightness due to rotational modulation of spots on the surface.

Monitoring of the star's spectral lines suggested a possible correlation between the star's chromospheric activity and the orbital period of its planet HD 179949 b. Later observations showed that this correlation is not present, with the star's activity being in synchrony with the star's rotation, instead of the exoplanet's orbit. In 2022, stellar X-ray flares from the star were found to be uncorrelated with the exoplanet's orbital period.

== Planetary system ==
The discovery of an extrasolar planet orbiting HD 179949 with a period of only 3.1 days was published in 2001. It was detected with the radial velocity method from observations of the star with the UCLES spectrograph, in the Anglo-Australian Telescope, as part of the Anglo-Australian Planet Search. With a minimum mass of 92% of the mass of Jupiter, it is a hot Jupiter, orbiting the star at a distance of only 0.04 AU. Its orbit is nearly circular, with a best fit orbital eccentricity of 0.022 ± 0.015. Planets close to their stars have high chances of transit, but photometric observations of HD 179949 ruled out this possibility.

Infrared observations of HD 179949 with the Spitzer Space Telescope detected 0.14% variations in the system's brightness in phase with the orbital period of the planet, indicating large luminosity variation between the illuminated side and the dark side of the planet, implying that less than 21% of the incident stellar energy is transferred to the dark side. In 2014, infrared observations of the system with the CRIRES instrument, at the Very Large Telescope, directly detected the thermal spectrum of the planet, revealing absorption features of carbon monoxide and water vapor in its atmosphere. The radial velocity of the planet has variations of 142.8 ± 3.4 km/s due to orbital motion, which allowed the calculation of a real mass of 0.98 ± 0.04 Jupiter masses and an orbital inclination of 67.7 ± 4.3 degrees.

The HD 179949 planetary system
Companion (in order from star)	Mass	Semimajor axis (AU)	Orbital period (days)	Eccentricity	Inclination (°)	Radius
b / Mastika	0.98 ± 0.004 M_{J}	0.0443 ± 0.0026	3.092514 ± 0.000032	0.022 ± 0.015	67.7±4.3	—
