= HD 187085 b =

Exoplanet orbiting the star HD 187085 in the constellation of Sagittarius

Discovery
- Discovered by: Jones et al.
- Discovery site: Australia
- Discovery date: March 14, 2006
- Detection method: Doppler spectroscopy

Orbital characteristics
- Apastron: 2.72 AU (407,000,000 km)
- Periastron: 1.38 AU (206,000,000 km)
- Semi-major axis: 2.05 AU (307,000,000 km)
- Eccentricity: 0.33
- Orbital period (sidereal): 986 d 2.70 y
- Average orbital speed: 22.7
- Time of periastron: 2,450,912
- Argument of periastron: 94
- Semi-amplitude: 26
- Star: HD 187085

Physical characteristics
- Mass: >0.75 M_{J}

HD 187085 b is an extrasolar planet discovered in 2006 by a team led by Hugh Jones. HD 187085 b orbits its star in a highly eccentric orbit. The discovery was made as part of the Anglo-Australian Planet Search.

Their interpretation of the data set the eccentricity at 0.47. Using a statistical computer program, another team reinterpreted the same data for a lower eccentricity of 0.33.

== See also ==
- HD 188015 b
- HD 20782 b
