= HD 208487 =

Star in the constellation Grus

HD 208487 / Itonda
Observation data Epoch J2000 Equinox ICRS
- Constellation: Grus
- Right ascension: 21^{h} 57^{m} 19.84754^{s}
- Declination: −37° 45′ 49.0480″
- Apparent magnitude (V): 7.47

Characteristics
- Evolutionary stage: main sequence
- Spectral type: G1/3V
- B−V color index: 0.568±0.009
- Variable type: Stable

Astrometry
Radial velocity (R_{v})	5.575±0.0004 km/s
Proper motion (μ)	RA: 101.032 mas/yr Dec.: −118.842 mas/yr
Parallax (π)	22.2688±0.0304 mas
Distance	146.5 ± 0.2 ly (44.91 ± 0.06 pc)
Absolute magnitude (M_{V})	4.26
Absolute bolometric magnitude (M_{bol})	4.06

Details
Mass	1.15±0.04 M_{☉}
Radius	1.16±0.02 R_{☉}
Luminosity	1.71±0.09 L_{☉}
Surface gravity (log g)	4.36±0.03 cgs
Temperature	6,134+54 −50 K
Metallicity [Fe/H]	+0.09±0.04 dex
Rotation	29 days
Rotational velocity (v sin i)	3.688 km/s
Age	1.95+1.41 −1.11 Gyr

Other designations
- Itonda, CD−38° 14804, HD 208487, HIP 108375, SAO 213432, PPM 302029

Database references
SIMBAD	data
Exoplanet Archive	data

HD 208487 is a star with an orbiting exoplanet in the constellation of Grus. Based on parallax measurements, it is located at a distance of 146.5 light years from the Sun. The absolute magnitude of HD 208487 is 4.26, but at that distance the apparent visual magnitude is 7.47, which is too faint to be viewed with the naked eye. The system is drifting further away with a radial velocity of 5.6 km/s. It is a member of the thin disk population.

The spectrum of HD 208487 presents as an ordinary G-type main-sequence star with a stellar classification of G1/3V. It is a relatively young star, with age estimates of 1–2 billion years, and is spinning with a projected rotational velocity of 3.7 km/s. The star has 16% greater mass and a 17% larger radius than the Sun. The abundance of iron, a measure of the star's metallicity, is similar to the Sun. It is radiating 176% of the luminosity of the Sun from its photosphere at an effective temperature of 6,143 K. The level of magnetic activity in the chromosphere is low.

The star HD 208487 is named Itonda and the exoplanet Mintome. The names were selected in the NameExoWorlds campaign by Gabon, during the 100th anniversary of the IAU. Itonda, in the Myene tongue, corresponds to all that is beautiful. Mintome, in the Fang tongue, is a mythical land where a brotherhood of brave men live.

== Planetary system ==
There is one confirmed planet orbiting the star HD 208487, which is designated HD 208487 b. It has a mass at least half that of Jupiter and is located in an eccentric 130-day orbit.

The discovery of a second planet in the system was announced on 13 September 2005, by P.C. Gregory. The discovery was made using Bayesian analysis of the radial velocity dataset to determine the planetary parameters. However, further analysis revealed that an alternative two-planet solution for the HD 208487 system was possible, with a planet in a 28-day orbit instead of the 908-day orbit postulated, and it was concluded that activity on the star is more likely to be responsible for the residuals to the one-planet solution than the presence of a second planet.

A 2025 study detected two radial velocity candidates at periods of 923 and 1,280 days, none of which is correlated to stellar activity signals. The former has a period close to the challenged planet. Planet c, with the shortest period, would have a minimum mass of 0.32 M_{J} and thus be similar to Saturn, while planet d would have a minimum mass of 0.15 M_{J} and thus be a super-Neptune.

If both candidates are confirmed, the system of HD 208487 would challenge the "Peas in a Pod" trend – when planetary systems with three or more planets are evenly spaced around the host star – given that the orbits of c and d are close to each other, but distant from that of planet b. The bodies may have been initially equally-spaced, but due to mutual gravitational perturbations, migrated from their original orbits.

The HD 208487 planetary system
Companion (in order from star)	Mass	Semimajor axis (AU)	Orbital period (days)	Eccentricity	Inclination (°)	Radius
b / Mintome	≥0.46+0.01 −0.00 M_{J}	0.53±0.00	129.36±0.02	0.37±0.01	—	—
c (unconfirmed)	≥0.32±0.01 M_{J}	1.94±0.01	923.06+2.02 −2.76	0.19+0.01 −0.02	—	—
d (unconfirmed)	≥0.15+0.01 −0.02 M_{J}	2.54+0.02 −0.01	1,380.13+19.20 −8.25	0.11+0.03 −0.06	—	—

== See also ==
- Lists of exoplanets
