= HD 187085 =

Star in the constellation Sagittarius

Observation data Epoch J2000 Equinox ICRS
- Constellation: Sagittarius
- Right ascension: 19^{h} 49^{m} 33.9667^{s}
- Declination: −37° 46′ 49.981″
- Apparent magnitude (V): +7.225

Characteristics
- Spectral type: G0V
- B−V color index: 0.622±0.007

Astrometry
Radial velocity (R_{v})	+17.70±0.59 km/s
Proper motion (μ)	RA: −2.853±0.344 mas/yr Dec.: +8.514±0.363 mas/yr
Parallax (π)	3.2263±0.1847 mas
Distance	1,010 ± 60 ly (310 ± 20 pc)
Absolute magnitude (M_{V})	4.00

Details
Mass	1.189±0.023 M_{☉}
Radius	1.270±0.066 R_{☉}
Luminosity	2.298+0.007 −0.006 L_{☉}
Surface gravity (log g)	4.279±0.041 cgs
Temperature	6,117±27 K
Metallicity [Fe/H]	+0.12±0.04 dex
Rotation	~21 days
Age	2.747±0.838 Myr

Other designations
- CD–38°13701, GC 27415, HD 187085, HIP 97546, SAO 211579

Database references
SIMBAD	data

HD 187085 is a yellow–hued star in the southern constellation of Sagittarius. It is too faint to be visible to the naked eye, having an apparent visual magnitude of +7.225. The star is located at a distance of approximately 1,010 light years from the Sun based on parallax, and is drifting further away with a radial velocity of +18 km/s.

This is an ordinary G-type main-sequence star with a stellar classification of G0V, which means it is generating energy through core hydrogen fusion. It is younger than the Sun with an estimated age of 2.7 billion years and is spinning with a leisurely rotation period of around 21 days. The star is 27% larger and 19% more massive than the Sun. It is radiating 2.3 times the luminosity of the Sun from its photosphere at an effective temperature of 6,117 K.

In 2006, an extrasolar planet was announced orbiting HD 187085, with a minimum mass slightly below that of the planet Jupiter. It is orbiting the host star with a period of around 2.8 years. The orbit overlaps the habitable zone of this star. In 2009, the presence of an infrared excess was announced, suggesting a debris disk orbits the star.

The HD 187085 planetary system
Companion (in order from star)	Mass	Semimajor axis (AU)	Orbital period (days)	Eccentricity	Inclination (°)	Radius
b	≥0.836±0.011 M_{J}	2.100±0.032	1,019.74+21.29 −22.58	0.251+0.221 −0.191	—	—

== See also ==
- HD 188015
- HD 20782
- List of extrasolar planets
