= HD 183263 =

Star in the constellation Aquila

Observation data Epoch J2000 Equinox ICRS
- Constellation: Aquila
- Right ascension: 19^{h} 28^{m} 24.57137^{s}
- Declination: +08° 21′ 29.0045″
- Apparent magnitude (V): 7.86

Characteristics
- Evolutionary stage: subgiant
- Spectral type: G2 IV
- B−V color index: 0.678±0.012

Astrometry
Radial velocity (R_{v})	−50.377±0.0005 km/s
Proper motion (μ)	RA: −18.947±0.021 mas/yr Dec.: −32.190±0.017 mas/yr
Parallax (π)	18.3425±0.0206 mas
Distance	177.8 ± 0.2 ly (54.52 ± 0.06 pc)
Absolute magnitude (M_{V})	4.16

Details
Mass	1.20±0.06 M_{☉}
Radius	1.117±0.038 R_{☉}
Luminosity	2.04 L_{☉}
Surface gravity (log g)	4.403±0.060 cgs
Temperature	5,936±44 K
Metallicity [Fe/H]	0.302±0.030 dex
Rotation	32 days
Rotational velocity (v sin i)	1.56±0.50 km/s
Age	8.1 Gyr

Other designations
- BD+08°4109, HD 179791, HIP 95740, SAO 124664, PPM 167917, TYC 1055-3415-1, GSC 01055-03415

Database references
SIMBAD	data
Exoplanet Archive	data

HD 183263 is a star with a pair of orbiting exoplanets located in the equatorial constellation of Aquila. It has an apparent visual magnitude of 7.86, which is too faint to be visible to the naked eye. The distance to this system is 178 light years based on parallax measurements, but it is drifting closer with a heliocentric radial velocity of −50 km/s. Judging from its motion through space, this star is predicted to approach to within 32 light-years of the Sun in around 952,000 years. At that distance, it will be faintly visible to the naked eye.

This is an older star with a spectrum matching a stellar classification of G2 IV, indicating it is about to leave the main sequence after exhausting the supply of hydrogen at its core. It will then evolve into a red giant before dying as a white dwarf. This star has an absolute magnitude (apparent magnitude at 10 pc) of 4.16 compared to the Sun’s 4.83, which indicates the star is more luminous than the Sun, and therefore hotter by about 100 K. At the age of 8.1 billion years, the magnetic activity in its chromosphere is quiet and it is spinning slowly with a rotation period of 32 days.

== Planetary system ==
The star has two known super-jovian exoplanets in orbit around it. Exoplanet b was discovered in 2005 while exoplanet c was discovered in 2008. In 2022, the planet's inclination and true mass were measured via astrometry, yielding 73°+64°
−32° and 9.31+1.52
−1.82 M_{J} respectively, values that were thereafter refined to 110°+12°
−13° and 8.92+0.91
−0.56 M_{J} in 2025.

The HD 183263 planetary system
Companion (in order from star)	Mass	Semimajor axis (AU)	Orbital period (years)	Eccentricity	Inclination (°)	Radius
b	≥ 3.78+0.13 −0.14 M_{J}	1.522±0.025	1.71016(82)	0.3842+0.0080 −0.0078	—	—
c	8.92+0.91 −0.56 M_{J}	6.07±0.11	13.62±0.13	0.019±0.011	70+12 −13 or 110+12 −13	—

== See also ==
- List of multiplanetary systems
- List of exoplanetary host stars
