= HD 102117 =

Star in the constellation Centaurus

HD 102117 / Uklun
Observation data Epoch J2000 Equinox ICRS
- Constellation: Centaurus
- Right ascension: 11^{h} 44^{m} 50.46086^{s}
- Declination: −58° 42′ 13.3580″
- Apparent magnitude (V): 7.47

Characteristics
- Evolutionary stage: subgiant
- Spectral type: G6V
- B−V color index: 0.721±0.009
- Variable type: Constant

Astrometry
Radial velocity (R_{v})	+49.52±0.12 km/s
Proper motion (μ)	RA: −63.574 mas/yr Dec.: −70.331 mas/yr
Parallax (π)	25.3531±0.0178 mas
Distance	128.65 ± 0.09 ly (39.44 ± 0.03 pc)
Absolute magnitude (M_{V})	4.48

Details
Mass	1.37±0.130 M_{☉} 1.03±0.05 M_{☉}
Radius	1.27 R_{☉}
Luminosity	1.54 L_{☉}
Surface gravity (log g)	4.37±0.06 cgs
Temperature	5,695±44 K
Metallicity [Fe/H]	0.30±0.03 dex
Rotational velocity (v sin i)	0.88±0.5 km/s
Age	5.3±3.4 Gyr

Other designations
- Uklun, CD−58°4207, HD 102117, HIP 57291, SAO 239348

Database references
SIMBAD	data
Exoplanet Archive	data

HD 102117 or Uklun /ˈʌklən/ is a star in the southern constellation of Centaurus. With an apparent visual magnitude of 7.47, it is too dim to be seen without binoculars or a small telescope. It is located at a distance of approximately 129 light-years from the Sun based on parallax. HD 102117 is drifting further away with a radial velocity of +50 km/s, having come to within 43.9 light-years some 692,000 years ago. It has one known planet.

The stellar classification of HD 102117 is G6V, which matches the spectrum of an ordinary G-type main-sequence star. It is roughly five billion years old and is spinning with a projected rotational velocity of 0.9 km/s. The star shows only a low level of chromospheric activity and is photometrically stable, meaning it doesn't vary significantly in brightness. It appears metal-enriched, showing a higher abundance of heavy elements compared to the Sun.

== Planetary system ==
In 2004, the Anglo-Australian Planet Search announced a planet orbiting the star. A short time later the HARPS team also announced the presence of a planet around this star. Both groups detected this planet with the radial velocity method.

HD 102117, and its planet HD 102117b, were chosen as part of the 2019 NameExoWorlds campaign organised by the International Astronomical Union, which assigned each country a star and planet to be named. HD 102117 was assigned to Pitcairn Islands. The winning proposal named the star Uklun, from the word aklan 'we/us' in the Pitcairn language, and the planet Leklsullun /lɛkəlsʌlən/, from the phrase lekl salan 'child/children' (lit. 'little person').

The HD 102117 planetary system
Companion (in order from star)	Mass	Semimajor axis (AU)	Orbital period (days)	Eccentricity	Inclination (°)	Radius
b / Leklsullun	0.172 ± 0.020 M_{J}	0.1532 ± 0.0088	20.8133 ± 0.0064	0.121 ±0.082	—	—

== See also ==
- List of extrasolar planets
- HARPS spectrograph
- Anglo-Australian Planet Search
