= Anglo-Australian Planet Search =

The Anglo Australian Planet Search or (AAPS) is a long-term astronomical survey started in 1998 and continuing to the present. It is being carried out on the 3.9-metre Anglo-Australian Telescope (AAT) of the Anglo-Australian Observatory in Australia. The purpose of this survey is to catalog planets around more than 240 nearby stars of the southern hemisphere. For its observations, the AAT uses the University College London Echelle Spectrograph, UCLES, an echelle spectrograph from the University College London located at the telescope's coudé focus. This survey uses the radial velocity method to search for extrasolar planets.

The survey eventually switched its main focus to detecting long-period Jupiter analogs.

== Planets discovered by AAPS ==
This survey has announced the discovery of 28 planetary objects as of February 2014, including three multi-planet systems.

Planet	Date announced
Quijote	3 December 2000
ε Ret b	3 December 2000
Mastika	3 December 2000
HD 142 b	Oct 2001
Guarani	Oct 2001
π Men b	Oct 2001
HD 2039 b	13 June 2002
HD 73526 b	13 June 2002
HD 30177 b	13 June 2002
HD 76700 b	13 June 2002
HD 196050 b	13 June 2002
ρ Ind b	13 June 2002
τ^{1} Gru b	17 September 2002
HD 70642 b	4 July 2003
Leklsullun	15 September 2004
Noifasui	15 September 2004
HD 154857 b	15 September 2004
Dulcinea	15 September 2004
Mintome	15 September 2004
HD 20782 b	1 June 2006
HD 187085 b	1 June 2006
HD 73526 c	10 August 2006
HD 23127 b	7 February 2007
HD 154857 c	7 February 2007
HD 159868 b	7 February 2007
GJ 832 b	1 September 2008
HD 16417 b	23 February 2009
HD 114613 b	22 January 2014

== See also ==
- High Accuracy Radial Velocity Planet Searcher is another planet detector in the southern hemisphere.
- Lists of exoplanets
