= HD 183263 c =

Extrasolar planet in the constellation Aquila

Discovery
- Discovered by: Wright et al.
- Discovery site: Lick and Keck observatories
- Discovery date: December 8, 2008
- Detection method: Doppler spectroscopy

Orbital characteristics
- Semi-major axis: 5.69±0.11 AU
- Eccentricity: 0.051±0.010
- Orbital period (sidereal): 4,684±71 d
- Time of periastron: 2,450,430±310
- Argument of periastron: 299±22
- Semi-amplitude: 77.5±1.1
- Star: HD 183263

HD 183263 c is an exoplanet orbiting approximately 4.25 AU from the parent star HD 183263. This planet was announced by Wright et al. on December 8, 2008 using multiple observations in Lick and Keck observatories earlier in that year. This planet was calculated to have minimum mass of 3.82 times more than Jupiter and takes 8.08 years to revolve around the star. The orbital distance varies from 3.17 to 5.33 AU, corresponding to the orbital eccentricity of 0.253.

A 2022 study estimated the true mass of HD 183263 c at about 9.31 M_{J} via astrometry, although this estimate is poorly constrained.

== See also ==
- HD 183263 b
