= HD 101930 b =

Extrasolar planet orbiting the star HD 101930

Discovery
- Discovered by: Lovis, Mayor, Pepe et al.
- Discovery site: La Silla Observatory
- Discovery date: 14 February 2005
- Detection method: Doppler spectroscopy (HARPS)

Orbital characteristics
- Apastron: 0.335 AU (50,100,000 km)
- Periastron: 0.077 AU (11,500,000 km)
- Semi-major axis: 0.302 AU (45,200,000 km)
- Eccentricity: 0.11 ± 0.02
- Orbital period (sidereal): 70.46 ± 0.18 d 0.1929 y
- Average orbital speed: 46.8
- Time of periastron: 2,453,145.0 ± 2.0
- Argument of periastron: 251 ± 11
- Semi-amplitude: 18.1 ± 0.4
- Star: HD 101930

Physical characteristics
- Mass: >0.30 M_{J} (>95 M_{🜨})

HD 101930 b is an extrasolar planet orbiting the star HD 101930. It has a minimum mass a third of Jupiter's, nearly the same as Saturn's so it is thought to be a gas giant. It orbits the star closer than Mercury, and the orbit is slightly eccentric.
