= HD 102117 b =

Extrasolar planet

HD 102117 b / Leklsullun
Discovery
- Discovered by: Tinney et al.
- Discovery site: Anglo-Australian Observatory, Australia
- Discovery date: September 16, 2004
- Detection method: Radial Velocity

Orbital characteristics
- Apastron: 0.1717 AU (25,690,000 km)
- Periastron: 0.1347 AU (20,150,000 km)
- Semi-major axis: 0.1532 ± 0.0088 AU (22,920,000 ± 1,320,000 km)
- Eccentricity: 0.106 ± 0.07
- Orbital period (sidereal): 20.8133 ± 0.0064 d
- Average orbital speed: 80.35
- Time of periastron: 10942.9 ± 3 2.400.000
- Argument of periastron: 283 ± 3
- Semi-amplitude: 11.8 ± 0.77
- Star: HD 102117

Physical characteristics
- Mass: >0.172 ± 0.018 M_{J} (>54.7 M_{🜨})

HD 102117 b, formally named Leklsullun, is a planet that orbits the star HD 102117. The planet is a small gas giant a fifth the size of Jupiter. It orbits very close to its star, but not in a "torch orbit" like the famous 51 Pegasi b. It was one of the smallest extrasolar planets discovered as of 2006.

In 2004, the Anglo-Australian Planet Search announced a planet orbiting the star HD 102117. A short time later the HARPS team also announced the presence of HD 102117 b around the same star. Both groups detected this planet using the radial velocity method.
