= HD 188015 b =

Extrasolar planet in the constellation Vulpecula

Discovery
- Discovered by: Marcy et al.
- Discovery site: United States
- Discovery date: January 25, 2005
- Detection method: Doppler spectroscopy

Orbital characteristics
- Apastron: 1.368 AU (204.6 million km)
- Periastron: 1.038 AU (155.3 million km)
- Semi-major axis: 1.203 ± 0.070 AU (180.0 ± 10.5 million km)
- Eccentricity: 0.137 ± 0.026
- Orbital period (sidereal): 461.2 ± 1.7 d 1.263 y
- Average orbital speed: 28.47
- Time of periastron: 2,451,787 ± 17
- Argument of periastron: 222° ± 10
- Semi-amplitude: 37.6 ± 1.2
- Star: HD 188015

Physical characteristics
- Mass: >1.50 ± 0.13 M_{J}

HD 188015 b is an extrasolar planet announced by the California and Carnegie Planet Search team in 2005. Like majority of known planets, it was discovered using the radial velocity method.

The planet has a minimum mass of about 1.25 Jupiter masses. It orbits HD 188015 in a slightly eccentric orbit with a semi-major axis about 20% further than Earth's.

Stability analysis reveals that if Earth-sized planets existed at the Trojan points of HD 188015 b, their orbits would be stable for long periods of time.

== Bibliography ==
- Butler, R. P.; Wright, J. T.; Marcy, G. W.; Fischer, D. A.; Vogt, S. S.; Tinney, C. G.; Jones, H. R. A.; Carter, B. D.; Johnson, J. A.; McCarthy, C.; Penny, A. J. (2006). "Catalog of Nearby Exoplanets". The Astrophysical Journal. 646 (1): 505–522. arXiv:astro-ph/0607493. Bibcode:2006ApJ...646..505B. doi:10.1086/504701. S2CID 119067572.
- Raghavan, Deepak; Henry, Todd J.; Mason, Brian D.; Subasavage, John P.; Jao, Wei‐Chun; Beaulieu, Thom D.; Hambly, Nigel C. (2006). "Two Suns in The Sky: Stellar Multiplicity in Exoplanet Systems". The Astrophysical Journal. 646 (1): 523–542. arXiv:astro-ph/0603836. Bibcode:2006ApJ...646..523R. doi:10.1086/504823. S2CID 5669768.
