= HD 117207 b =

Extrasolar planet orbiting HD 117207

Discovery
- Discovered by: Marcy et al.
- Discovery site: Keck Observatory
- Discovery date: 25 January 2005
- Detection method: radial velocity

Orbital characteristics
- Semi-major axis: 3.773+0.036 −0.035 AU
- Eccentricity: 0.04+0.026 −0.024
- Orbital period (sidereal): 2606+12 −13 d 7.136+0.034 −0.035 yr
- Average orbital speed: 15.9
- Inclination: 76.6°+9.3° −12.0° or 103.4°+12.0° −9.3°
- Longitude of ascending node: 42°+17° −18°
- Time of periastron: 2456669+341 −339
- Argument of periastron: 186°+48° −47°
- Semi-amplitude: 26.6±0.93
- Star: HD 117207

Physical characteristics
- Mass: 2.106+0.16 −0.089 M_{J}

HD 117207 b is an exoplanet orbiting at 3.77 astronomical units around HD 117207, taking about 7.14 years to complete its orbit. Its orbit has a low to moderate eccentricity. This planet was announced in January 2005 by Marcy at the Keck Observatory. HD 117207 b has a minimum mass of 1.88 Jupiter masses, and in 2023 its inclination and true mass were determined via astrometry.
