= Rho Indi =

Star in the constellation Indus

ρ Indi
- Location of ρ Indi (circled in red)

Observation data Epoch J2000 Equinox J2000
- Constellation: Indus
- Right ascension: 22^{h} 54^{m} 39.482^{s}
- Declination: −70° 04′ 25.35″
- Apparent magnitude (V): +6.05

Characteristics
- Evolutionary stage: subgiant
- Spectral type: G1 V Fe+0.3
- U−B color index: +0.22
- B−V color index: +0.66

Astrometry
Radial velocity (R_{v})	−2.29±0.12 km/s
Proper motion (μ)	RA: −43.140 mas/yr Dec.: +72.728 mas/yr
Parallax (π)	37.4641±0.0253 mas
Distance	87.06 ± 0.06 ly (26.69 ± 0.02 pc)
Absolute magnitude (M_{V})	+3.90

Details
Mass	1.317±0.083 M_{☉}
Radius	1.456±0.024 R_{☉}
Luminosity	2.24 L_{☉}
Surface gravity (log g)	4.23 cgs
Temperature	5,849 K
Metallicity [Fe/H]	0.18 dex
Rotation	26.7 d
Rotational velocity (v sin i)	3.1 km/s
Age	4.6+1.0 −0.4 Gyr

Other designations
- ρ Ind, CPD−70°2971, FK5 865, HR 8701, HD 216437, HIP 113137, SAO 258084

Database references
SIMBAD	data
Exoplanet Archive	data

ρ Indi, Latinised as Rho Indi, is a yellow-hued star in the constellation Indus. With an apparent visual magnitude of +6.05 it is, barely, a naked eye star, not visible in the Northern Hemisphere outside the tropics. Based upon an annual parallax shift of 37.46 mas, it is located 87 light-years (27 parsecs) from the Sun. The star is moving closer to the Sun with a radial velocity of −2 km/s.

== Properties ==
The stellar classification of Rho Indi is G1 V Fe+0.3, which indicates it is a G-type main-sequence star with a mild overabundance of iron in its outer atmosphere. However, Houk and Cowley (1975) classified it as G2.5 IV, suggesting it is instead a somewhat more evolved subgiant star. It has an estimated 1.32 times the mass of the Sun and 1.46 times the Sun's radius. The star is radiating about 2.24 times the Sun's luminosity from its photosphere at an effective temperature of 5,849 K. It is around 4.6 billion years old and is spinning with a leisurely projected rotational velocity of 3.1 km/s.

== Planetary system ==
On September 17, 2002, this star was found to have a planetary companion, designated Rho Indi b. The discovery was made by measuring variations in the host star's radial velocity, thereby indicating the presence of a perturbing object. Based upon the data, the object is orbiting the host star with a period of about 3.7 years at an eccentricity of 0.32. The semimajor axis for this orbit is around 2.5 times the distance from the Earth to the Sun. Since the inclination of the orbit to the line-of-sight was initially unknown, only a lower bound on the planet's mass could be determined. It has at least 2.3 times Jupiter's mass. In 2023, the inclination and true mass of Rho Indi b were determined via astrometry.

The Rho Indi planetary system
Companion (in order from star)	Mass	Semimajor axis (AU)	Orbital period (years)	Eccentricity	Inclination	Radius
b	3.88±0.73 M_{J}	2.501+0.036 −0.037	3.658±0.034	0.318±0.028	35.0+10.0 −6.1 or 145.0+6.1 −10.0°	—

== See also ==
- Tau^{1} Gruis, a star with a separate exoplanet discovery by the same team
