= HD 208487 b =

Extrasolar planet in the constellation Grus

HD 208487 b / Mintome
Discovery
- Discovered by: Tinney, Butler, Marcy et al.
- Discovery site: United States
- Discovery date: September 16, 2004
- Detection method: Doppler spectroscopy

Orbital characteristics
- Semi-major axis: 0.524 ± 0.030 AU (78,400,000 ± 4,500,000 km)
- Eccentricity: 0.24 ± 0.16
- Orbital period (sidereal): 130.08 ± 0.51 d
- Time of periastron: 2,450,999 ± 15
- Argument of periastron: 113
- Semi-amplitude: 19.7 ± 3.6
- Star: HD 208487

HD 208487 b is an extrasolar planet located approximately 144 light-years away in the constellation of Grus, orbiting the star HD 208487. This planet has a minimum mass close to half that of Jupiter and is most probably a gas giant. The planet orbits the star in a close, eccentric orbit. One revolution takes 130 days to complete. This planet was discovered on September 16, 2004, by Tinney, Butler, and Marcy et al. using Doppler spectroscopy to measure the star's radial velocity changing over time as the planet revolves around its orbit.

The planet HD 208487 b is named Mintome. The name was selected in the NameExoWorlds campaign by Gabon, during the 100th anniversary of the IAU. Mintome, in the Fang tongue, is a mythical land where a brotherhood of brave men live.
