= HD 142 b =

Extrasolar planet in the constellation of Phoenix

Discovery
- Discovered by: Anglo-Australian Planet Search team
- Discovery site: Australian Astronomical Observatory
- Discovery date: Oct 15, 2001
- Detection method: Doppler spectroscopy

Orbital characteristics
- Semi-major axis: 1.02 ± 0.03 AU (152,600,000 ± 4,500,000 km)
- Eccentricity: 0.17 ± 0.06
- Orbital period (sidereal): 349.7 ± 1.2 d
- Inclination: 59°±7°
- Time of periastron: 2,452,683 ± 26
- Argument of periastron: 327 ± 26
- Semi-amplitude: 33.2 ± 2.5
- Star: HD 142

Physical characteristics
- Mass: 7.1±1.0 M_{J}

HD 142 b is a jovian exoplanet approximately 85.5 light years away in the constellation of Phoenix. This planet was discovered in 2001 by the Anglo-Australian Planet Search team.

An astrometric measurement of the planet's inclination and true mass was published in 2022 as part of Gaia DR3.
