= Epsilon Reticuli =

Star in the constellation Reticulum

- Location of ε Reticuli (circled)

Observation data Epoch J2000 Equinox ICRS
- Constellation: Reticulum
- A
- Right ascension: 04^{h} 16^{m} 29.028^{s}
- Declination: −59° 18′ 07.76″
- Apparent magnitude (V): 4.44
- B
- Right ascension: 04^{h} 16^{m} 30.040^{s}
- Declination: −59° 17′ 57.18″
- Apparent magnitude (V): 12.5

Characteristics
- Spectral type: K2 III-IV + DA3.3
- U−B color index: +1.07
- B−V color index: +1.08

Astrometry

A
Radial velocity (R_{v})	+29.3 km/s
Proper motion (μ)	RA: −47.785 mas/yr Dec.: −167.806 mas/yr
Parallax (π)	54.2286±0.1019 mas
Distance	60.1 ± 0.1 ly (18.44 ± 0.03 pc)
Absolute magnitude (M_{V})	3.14

B
Proper motion (μ)	RA: −44.734 mas/yr Dec.: −175.448 mas/yr
Parallax (π)	54.5752±0.0318 mas
Distance	59.76 ± 0.03 ly (18.32 ± 0.01 pc)

Details

ε Reticuli A
Mass	1.46±0.01 M_{☉}
Radius	3.18±0.08 R_{☉}
Luminosity	6.2±0.6 L_{☉}
Surface gravity (log g)	3.76±0.05 cgs
Temperature	4,961±28 K
Metallicity [Fe/H]	0.26±0.07 dex
Rotational velocity (v sin i)	2.07±0.42 km/s
Age	2.89±0.06 Gyr

ε Reticuli B
Mass	0.60±0.02 M_{☉}
Radius	0.0132±0.0002 R_{☉}
Surface gravity (log g)	7.98±0.02 cgs
Temperature	15,310±350 K
Age	1.5 Gyr

Other designations
- JSP 56, ε Ret, CPD−59°324, HD 27442, CCDM J04165-5918AB, WDS J04165-5918AB
- Epsilon Reticuli A: GJ 167.3, GJ 9153, HIP 19921, HR 1355
- Epsilon Reticuli B: WD 0415-594

Database references
SIMBAD	data

Epsilon Reticuli, Latinized from ε Reticuli, is a double star approximately 60 light-years away in the southern constellation of Reticulum. The brighter member is visible to the naked eye with an apparent visual magnitude of 4.44. The primary component is an orange subgiant, while the secondary is a white dwarf. The two stars share a common motion through space and hence most likely form a binary star system. The brighter star should be easily visible without optical aid under dark skies in the southern hemisphere. In 2000, an extrasolar planet was confirmed to be orbiting the primary star in the system.

== Star system ==
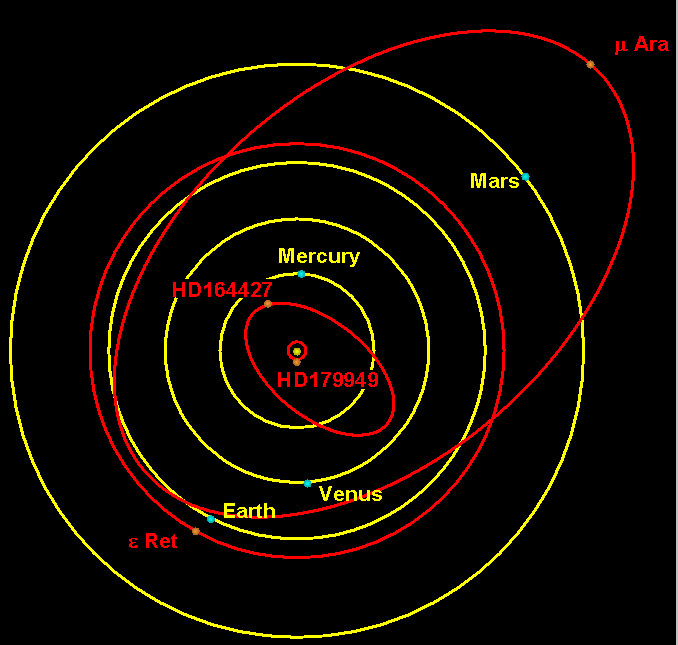
The inner Solar System superimposed behind the orbits of the planet Epsilon Reticuli b (and several others)

The primary component, Epsilon Reticuli A, is a subgiant star with a stellar classification of K2III–IV, indicating that the fusing of hydrogen in its core is coming to an end and it is in the process of expanding to a red giant. With an estimated mass of about 1.5 times the solar mass, it was probably an F0 star while in the main sequence. It has a radius of 3.18 times the solar radius, a luminosity of 6.2 the solar luminosity and an effective temperature of 4,961 K. As is typical of stars with giant planets, it has a high metallicity, with an iron abundance 82% larger than the Sun's.

The secondary star, Epsilon Reticuli B, is known as a visual companion since 1930, and in 2006 was confirmed as a physical companion on the basis of its common proper motion. It was noted that its color indices are incompatible with a main sequence object, but are consistent with a white dwarf. This was confirmed in 2007 by spectroscopic observations, that showed the absorption spectrum typical of a hydrogen-rich white dwarf (spectral type DA). This star has a visual apparent magnitude of 12.5 and is located at a separation of 13 arcseconds, corresponding to a projected physical separation of 240 AU and an orbital period of more than 2,700 years.

It is estimated that Epsilon Reticuli B has a mass of 0.60 M_{☉} and a radius of 0.0132 R_{☉}. Originally, when it was in the main sequence, it probably had a spectral type of A5 and a mass of 1.9 M_{☉}, and spent 1.3 billion years on this phase. From a measured effective temperature of 15,310 K, it has a cooling age (time spent as a white dwarf) of 200 million years, corresponding to a total age of 1.5 billion years. This age is inconsistent with the primary estimated age of 2.8 billion years, which suggests a smaller mass for the white dwarf or a larger mass for the primary.

== Planetary system ==
On December 11, 2000, a team of astronomers announced the discovery of a planet Epsilon Reticuli b. With a minimum mass of 1.17 that of Jupiter, the planet moves around Epsilon Reticuli A with an average separation of 1.16 AU. The eccentricity of the planet is extremely low (at around 0.06), and it completes an orbit every 418 days (or 1.13 years).

Stability analysis shows that the planet's Lagrangian points would be stable enough to host Earth-sized planets, though as yet no trojan planets have been detected in this system.

The Epsilon Reticuli planetary system
Companion (in order from star)	Mass	Semimajor axis (AU)	Orbital period (days)	Eccentricity	Inclination (°)	Radius
b	≥1.55±0.07 M_{J}	1.269±0.001	429.1±0.7	0.057±0.037	—	—

== See also ==
- List of exoplanets discovered between 2000–2009, including Epsilon Reticuli b
