= HD 188015 =

Star in the constellation Vulpecula

Observation data Epoch J2000.0 Equinox ICRS
- Constellation: Vulpecula
- Right ascension: 19^{h} 52^{m} 04.5427^{s}
- Declination: +28° 06′ 01.345″
- Apparent magnitude (V): 8.24

Characteristics
- Evolutionary stage: subgiant
- Spectral type: G5IV
- B−V color index: 0.727±0.010

Astrometry
Radial velocity (R_{v})	+0.16(12) km/s
Proper motion (μ)	RA: 52.809(15) mas/yr Dec.: −92.166(17) mas/yr
Parallax (π)	19.7004±0.0194 mas
Distance	165.6 ± 0.2 ly (50.76 ± 0.05 pc)
Absolute magnitude (M_{V})	4.47

Details
Mass	1.08±0.02 M_{☉}
Radius	1.21±0.03 R_{☉}
Luminosity	1.41±0.03 L_{☉}
Surface gravity (log g)	4.30±0.03 cgs
Temperature	5,726±28 K
Metallicity [Fe/H]	0.27±0.02 dex
Rotational velocity (v sin i)	5.0 km/s
Age	5.9±1.3 Gyr

Other designations
- BD+27 3539, HIP 97769, 2MASS J19520455+2806015

Database references
SIMBAD	data

HD 188015 is a yellow-hued star with an exoplanetary companion in the northern constellation of Vulpecula. It has an apparent visual magnitude of 8.24, making it an 8th magnitude star, and thus is too faint to be readily visible to the naked eye. The distance to this star can be estimated through parallax measurements, which yield a separation of 165.6 light years from the Sun.

This star was assigned a stellar classification of G5IV by J. F. Heard in 1956, matching the spectrum of an evolving G-type subgiant star. This suggests it has ceased or is about to stop hydrogen fusion in its core. The absolute magnitude of 4.47 lies just above the main sequence. It is estimated to be six billion years old and is chromospherically quiet with a projected rotational velocity of 5 km/s. The star is almost twice as metal-rich as the Sun. It has 1.1 times the mass and 1.2 times the radius of the Sun. HD 188015 is radiating 1.4 times the luminosity of the Sun from its photosphere at an effective temperature of 5,726 km/s.

== Companions ==
A stellar common proper motion candidate was announced in 2006 and designated HD 188015 B. It is located at an angular separation of 13″ along a position angle of 85°. The photometric distance estimate for this object is 153 ± 31 ly (46.9 ± 9.5 pc), matching the primary within the margin of error. They have a projected separation of 684 AU.

A Jovian planetary companion to this star was announced in 2005, based on radial velocity measurements indicating a periodic perturbation. It is orbiting the host star at a distance of 1.2 AU with a period of 1.26 years and an eccentricity (ovalness) of 0.14. The inclination of the orbital plane remains unknown, so only a lower bound on the planet's mass can be determined. It has a minimum mass equal to 1.5 times the mass of Jupiter. The orbital path of this object intersects the habitable zone of the star, which is likely to eject any Earth-like planet from that region. Nevertheless, habitable moons are still possible in this system.

The HD 188015 planetary system
Companion (in order from star)	Mass	Semimajor axis (AU)	Orbital period (days)	Eccentricity	Inclination (°)	Radius
b	>1.50 ± 0.13 M_{J}	1.203 ± 0.070	461.2 ± 1.7	0.137 ± 0.026	—	—

== See also ==
- HD 187085
- List of extrasolar planets
