= HD 117207 =

G-type star in the constellation Centaurus

Observation data Epoch J2000 Equinox ICRS
- Constellation: Centaurus
- Right ascension: 13^{h} 29^{m} 21.11291^{s}
- Declination: −35° 34′ 15.5880″
- Apparent magnitude (V): 7.240

Characteristics
- Evolutionary stage: main sequence
- Spectral type: G7IV-V
- B−V color index: 0.727±0.014

Astrometry
Radial velocity (R_{v})	−17.43±0.09 km/s
Proper motion (μ)	RA: −205.904 mas/yr Dec.: −71.402 mas/yr
Parallax (π)	30.9440±0.0256 mas
Distance	105.40 ± 0.09 ly (32.32 ± 0.03 pc)
Absolute magnitude (M_{V})	4.67

Details
Mass	1.053±0.028 M_{☉}
Radius	1.074±0.041 R_{☉}
Luminosity	1.163+0.002 −0.003 L_{☉}
Surface gravity (log g)	4.371±0.039 cgs
Temperature	5,732±53 K
Metallicity [Fe/H]	0.19±0.03 dex
Age	4.192±2.274 Gyr

Other designations
- CPD−34°8913, HD 117207, HIP 65808, SAO 204517

Database references
SIMBAD	data

HD 117207 is a star in the southern constellation Centaurus. With an apparent visual magnitude of 7.24, it is too dim to be visible to the naked eye but can be seen with a small telescope. Based upon parallax measurements, it is located at a distance of 105.4 light-years (32.3 parsecs) from the Sun. The star is drifting closer with a radial velocity of −17.4 km/s. It has an absolute magnitude of 4.67.

This object has a stellar classification of G7IV-V, showing blended spectral traits of a G-type main-sequence star and an older, evolving subgiant star. It is around four billion years old with 5% greater mass than the Sun and a 7% larger radius. The star is radiating 1.16 times the luminosity of the Sun from its photosphere at an effective temperature of 5,644 K.

In 2005, a planet was found orbiting the star using the radial velocity method, and was designated HD 117207 b. The orbital elements of this planet were refined in 2018, showing an orbital period of 7.18 years, a semimajor axis of 3.79 AU, and an eccentricity of 0.16. The minimum mass of this object is nearly double that of Jupiter. If an inner planet is orbiting the star, it must have an orbital period no greater than 3.46 years to satisfy Hill's criteria for dynamic stability. In 2023, the inclination and true mass of HD 117207 b were determined via astrometry.

The HD 117207 planetary system
Companion (in order from star)	Mass	Semimajor axis (AU)	Orbital period (years)	Eccentricity	Inclination (°)	Radius
b	2.106+0.16 −0.089 M_{J}	3.773+0.036 −0.035	7.136+0.034 −0.035	0.04+0.026 −0.024	76.6+9.3 −12.0 or 103.4+12.0 −9.3	—

== See also ==
- HD 117618
- List of extrasolar planets
