= HD 117618 b =

Extrasolar planet in the constellation Centaurus

HD 117618 b / Noifasui
Discovery
- Discovered by: C.G. Tinney, Butler, Marcy et al.
- Discovery site: Anglo-Australian Observatory
- Discovery date: 16 September 2004
- Detection method: Radial velocity

Orbital characteristics
- Apastron: 0.250 AU (37,400,000 km)
- Periastron: 0.102 AU (15,300,000 km)
- Semi-major axis: 0.176 ± 0.010 AU (26,300,000 ± 1,500,000 km)
- Eccentricity: 0.42 ± 0.17
- Orbital period (sidereal): 25.827 ± 0.019 d 0.070709 y
- Average orbital speed: 74.4
- Time of periastron: 2,450,832.2 ± 1.8
- Argument of periastron: 254 ± 19
- Semi-amplitude: 12.8 ± 2.2
- Star: HD 117618

Physical characteristics
- Mass: >0.178 ± 0.021 M_{J} (>56.5 M_{🜨})

HD 117618 b, named Noifasui by the IAU, is an exoplanet discovered orbiting the star HD 117618 in September 2004. The planet is a small gas giant with a minimum mass just 0.178 times that of Jupiter. It orbits close to its star in a very eccentric orbit.

== Name ==
The planet was originally named "HD 117618 b", being the second object in the HD 117618 system. It was given the name "Noifasui" by the IAU, chosen by Indonesian representatives for the NameExoWorlds campaign, meaning revolve around in Nias language (derived from the word ifasui, meaning to revolve around, and no, indicating that the action occurred in the past and continued to the present time). Its parent star was simultaneously named "Dofida" in the contest.
