= HD 114613 =

Star in the constellation Centaurus

- Location of HD 114613 (circled)

Observation data Epoch J2000.0 Equinox ICRS
- Constellation: Centaurus
- Right ascension: 13^{h} 12^{m} 03.18430^{s}
- Declination: −37° 48′ 10.8799″
- Apparent magnitude (V): 4.852±0.011

Characteristics
- Evolutionary stage: subgiant
- Spectral type: G4 IV
- B−V color index: 0.659±0.020

Astrometry
Radial velocity (R_{v})	−13.03±0.13 km/s
Proper motion (μ)	RA: −382.409 mas/yr Dec.: −46.147 mas/yr
Parallax (π)	48.8691±0.1058 mas
Distance	66.7 ± 0.1 ly (20.46 ± 0.04 pc)
Absolute magnitude (M_{V})	3.29

Details
Mass	1.25±0.03 M_{☉}
Radius	2.01±0.06 R_{☉}
Luminosity	4.057±0.014 L_{☉}
Surface gravity (log g)	3.97±0.02 cgs
Temperature	5,729±17 K
Metallicity [Fe/H]	0.19±0.01 dex
Rotation	34.1±3.5 d
Rotational velocity (v sin i)	2.4±0.5 km/s
Age	5.20±0.24 Gyr

Other designations
- CD−37°8437, FK5 3051, GJ 501.2, HD 114613, HIP 64408, HR 4979, SAO 204227

Database references
SIMBAD	data

HD 114613 (Gliese 501.2) is a fifth magnitude yellow subgiant star that lies 66.7 light-years (20.5 parsecs) away in the constellation of Centaurus.

== Stellar characteristics ==
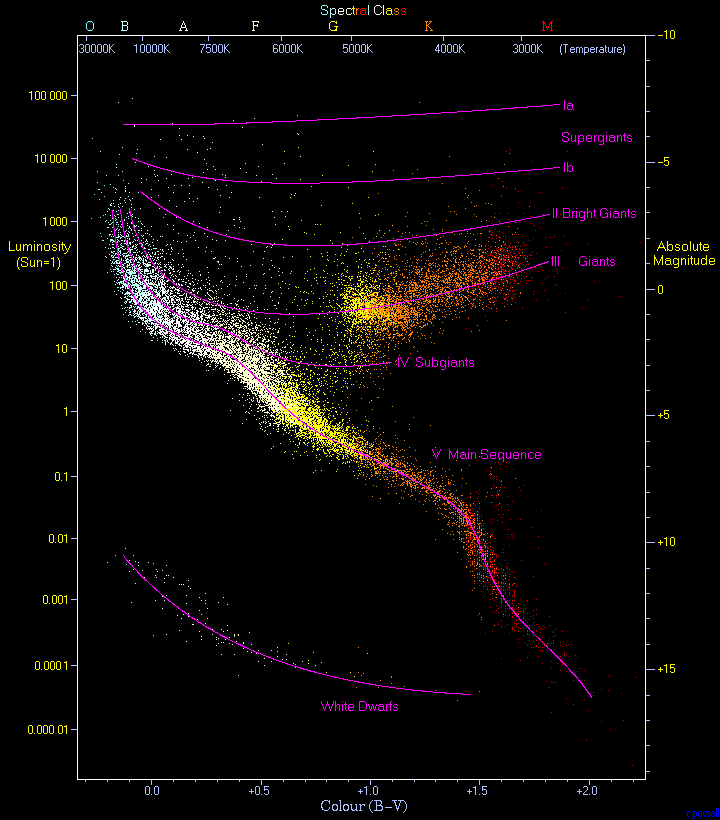

HD 114613 lies about two degrees south-east of Iota Centauri, towards the middle of Centaurus. Though it is fairly easily observable with the naked eye, the star does not have a Bayer or Flamsteed designation as the constellation of Centaurus contains many brighter stars.

The B-V colour and spectroscopic temperature of HD 114613 correspond with its spectral type of G4. This means that the star is only slightly cooler than the Sun, and has the yellow hue typical of G-type stars. On the Hertzsprung-Russell diagram (left) the star lies significantly above the main sequence, and is close to the subgiant branch; this means that HD 114613 has depleted the hydrogen in its core through nuclear fusion, and is increasing in radius while decreasing in temperature as it moves towards the giant branch.

As HD 114613 is ending hydrogen fusion, the star must be fairly old. When combined with a spectroscopically derived mass of 1.25 ± 0.03 M_{☉} and a surface gravity of log 3.95 ± 0.03 g the implied age of the star is 5.20 ± 0.24 billion years, making it slightly older than the Sun. Though stellar metallicities typically decrease with increasing stellar age, within the age range of the thin disk a wide range of metallicities are common; HD 114613's high iron abundance of 0.19 ± 0.01 dex (155 ± 4% of the solar abundance) is therefore not unusual. The rate of giant planet occurrence for Fe/H = 0.2 dex stars is about 15%, which makes it fairly unsurprising that the star could host a giant planet.

HD 114613 has a magnetic cycle with a period of 897 ± 61 days, about four-and-a-half times shorter than the Solar magnetic cycle and one of the shortest magnetic cycles known.

== Planet searches ==
Being bright and solar-type, HD 114613 is an attractive target for radial velocity (RV)-based planet searches.

HD 114613 was one of the 37 targets of the first RV-based planet search in the southern hemisphere, the ESO-CES survey that spanned between 1992 and 1998. This survey did not detect any companion with several Jovian masses out to a few AU. An extension of this survey to the HARPS spectrograph provides further constraint, suggesting that there are no Jupiter-mass companions out to about 5 AU.

HD 114613 is included in the samples of the ESO-CORALIE and AAT-UCLES planet searches that both began in 1998. Seemingly finding the star to be RV-stable and suitable for higher precision, HD 114613 was included in a subset of the CORALIE sample that became the sample of the ESO-HARPS high precision planet search that began in 2004, while the star was elevated in importance in the AAT sample in 2005. Though apparently not included in its main sample, HD 114613 is included in the sample of the Keck-HIRES Eta-Earth low-mass planet search that also began in 2004.

In Wittenmyer et al. 2012, HD 114613 is indicated to be a low-mass planet host. Though this references a Tuomi et al. 2012 (Tuomi, M., et al. 2012, MNRAS, submitted), no such paper was published that year. More recently, in a Tuomi et al. 2013, Tau Ceti is noted to have a similar activity index distribution to HD 114613. Again, a Tuomi et al. 2012 is referenced, though somewhat more completely (Tuomi, M., Jones, H. R. A., Jenkins, J. S., et al. 2012, MNRAS, submitted). No paper announcing HD 114613 as a low-mass planet host has been published as of 2014.

However, that does not mean the star is not a planet host. Wittenmyer et al. (2014) found HD 114613 to show a moderate-amplitude variation in its radial velocity with a period of 10.5 years, indicative of a long-period companion. The radial velocity semi-amplitude of 5.5 m/s translates to a planet with a minimum mass about half a Jupiter mass. The planet has an intermediate orbital eccentricity of 0.25, which means that it can be somewhat loosely considered a Jupiter analogue.

A study in 2023 did not detect this radial velocity signal, but instead detected a signal with a longer period of about 18 years, which shows indications of originating from a long-period magnetic activity cycle. This suggests that the previously detected signal is not planetary, but is related to stellar activity.
