= Tau1 Gruis =

Star in the constellation Grus

Tau^{1} Gruis
- Location of τ^{1} Gruis (circled in red)

Observation data Epoch J2000.0 Equinox ICRS
- Constellation: Grus
- Right ascension: 22^{h} 53^{m} 37.9324^{s}
- Declination: −48° 35′ 53.824″
- Apparent magnitude (V): +6.02

Characteristics
- Evolutionary stage: subgiant
- Spectral type: G0 V
- U−B color index: +0.17
- B−V color index: +0.62

Astrometry
Radial velocity (R_{v})	−1.1 km/s
Proper motion (μ)	RA: 217.943(18) mas/yr Dec.: −81.013(26) mas/yr
Parallax (π)	30.1918±0.0298 mas
Distance	108.0 ± 0.1 ly (33.12 ± 0.03 pc)
Absolute magnitude (M_{V})	+3.46

Details
Mass	1.28±0.04 M_{☉}
Radius	1.71±0.04 R_{☉}
Luminosity	3.39±0.02 L_{☉}
Surface gravity (log g)	4.07±0.03 cgs
Temperature	5,996±56 K
Metallicity [Fe/H]	0.27±0.02 dex
Rotational velocity (v sin i)	5.13 km/s
Age	4.2±0.6 Gyr

Other designations
- τ^{1} Gru, CD−49°13988, GJ 9802, HD 216435, HIP 113044, HR 8700, SAO 231343, GSC 09340-01818

Database references
SIMBAD	data
Exoplanet Archive	data
ARICNS	data

Tau^{1} Gruis, Latinized from τ^{1} Gruis, and catalogued as HD 216435 and HR 8700, is a yellow-hued star approximately 108 light-years away in the constellation of Grus (the Crane). The star is visible to the naked eye for some people, placing it in the Bright Star Catalogue. In 2002, one extrasolar planet was confirmed to orbit the star.

== Characteristics ==
Tau^{1} Gruis is a G-type main-sequence star of spectral type G0 V. It is estimated that the star has about 1.28 times the mass of the Sun, 1.71 times the Sun's radius, and about 3.6 times the luminosity. Due to its unusual brightness, at least one source suspects that the star may be a highly evolved subgiant star. It is thought that Tau^{1} Gruis is about 1.4 times more enriched with elements heavier than hydrogen, making a high abundance of iron likely. The Ca-II H line of the star suggests that it is chromospherically inactive, making it significantly older than previously predicted.

== Planetary system ==
On September 17, 2002, a team of astronomers led by Geoffrey Marcy announced the discovery of a giant planet around Tau^{1} Gruis. The radial velocity measurements suggest that the star has a companion with at least 1.23 times the mass of Jupiter. The planet's orbit stays inside the system's habitable zone for most of its revolution around the star, though at apoapsis, the planet falls outside of this zone.

The Tau^{1} Gruis planetary system
Companion (in order from star)	Mass	Semimajor axis (AU)	Orbital period (days)	Eccentricity	Inclination (°)	Radius
b	>1.26 ± 0.13 M_{J}	2.56 ± 0.17	1311 ± 49	0.070 ± 0.078	—	—

== See also ==
- Rho Indi
- 55 Cancri
- Phi^{2} Pavonis
