= Rho Indi b =

Extrasolar planet in the constellation Indus

Discovery
- Discovered by: Jones et al.
- Discovery site: Australia
- Discovery date: Sept 17, 2002
- Detection method: Doppler Spectroscopy

Designations
- Alternative names: HD 216437 b HIP 113137 b

Orbital characteristics
- Semi-major axis: 2.501+0.036 −0.037 AU
- Eccentricity: 0.318±0.028
- Orbital period (sidereal): 1336±12 d 3.658±0.034 yr
- Average orbital speed: 19.92 km/s
- Inclination: 35.0°+10.0° −6.1° or 145.0°+6.1° −10.0°
- Angular distance: 95.698 mas
- Longitude of ascending node: 117.0°±14.0°
- Time of periastron: 2,455,959+38 −35 JD
- Argument of periastron: 64.5°+5.5° −5.4°
- Semi-amplitude: 39.0±1.0 m/s
- Star: Rho Indi

Physical characteristics
- Mass: 3.88±0.73 M_{J}

Rho Indi b is an exoplanet that orbits around Rho Indi. Its semimajor axis is 2.54 AU placing just outside the star's habitable zone. The planet takes 3.7 years to orbit the star. It is over twice as massive as Jupiter. Since the inclination of the orbit to the line-of-sight was initially unknown, only a lower bound on the planet's mass could be determined. In 2023, the inclination and true mass of Rho Indi b were determined via astrometry.

== See also ==
- Tau^{1} Gruis b
