= Tau1 Gruis b =

Extrasolar planet in the constellation Grus

Tau^{1} Gruis b
Discovery
- Discovered by: Jones, et al.
- Discovery site: Australia
- Discovery date: 17 September 2002
- Detection method: Doppler spectroscopy

Orbital characteristics
- Semi-major axis: 2.561 AU (383.1 million km)
- Eccentricity: 0.0703 ± 0.0781
- Orbital period (sidereal): 1,311 ± 49 d
- Time of periastron: 2,450,870 ± 210
- Argument of periastron: 99.8
- Semi-amplitude: 19.6 ± 1.5
- Star: Tau^{1} Gruis

Tau^{1} Gruis b, also known as HD 216435 b, is an extrasolar planet approximately 109 light-years away in the constellation of Grus (the Crane). The planet was discovered orbiting the star Tau^{1} Gruis in September 2002. It was calculated that the planet orbits its sun at an average distance of 2.7 astronomical units. The planet is over 1.25 times as massive as Jupiter.

== See also ==
- 55 Cancri
- Phi2 Pavonis
- Rho Indi b
