= Chris Tinney =

Australian astronomer

Chris Tinney is an astronomer at the University of New South Wales who is focused on extrasolar planet and brown dwarf research. He is a member of the Anglo-Australian Planet Search team which has discovered over twenty planets by doppler spectroscopy. He is also the former head of astronomy at the Anglo-Australian Observatory.
