= List of exoplanets discovered between 2000–2009 =

This is a list of exoplanets discovered between 2000–2009.

For exoplanets detected only by radial velocity, the mass value is actually a lower limit. (See Minimum mass for more information)

| Name | Mass (M_{J}) | Radius (R_{J}) | Period (days) | Semi-major axis (AU) | Temp. (K) | Discovery method | Disc. Year | Distance (ly) | Host star mass (M_{☉}) | Host star temp. (K) | Remarks |
|---|---|---|---|---|---|---|---|---|---|---|---|
| 1RXS J160929.1-210524 b | 14.0 | 1.664 | | 330 | 1700 | imaging | 2008 | 472.94 | 0.85 | 4060 | |
| 2M1207b | 4.0 | | | 46.0 | 1150 | imaging | 2004 | 210.12 | 0.02 | | The first exoplanet discovered around a brown dwarf |
| 2MASS J2126-8140 | 13.3±1.7 | | | 6900 | 1800 | imaging | 2009 | 111.4±0.3 | 0.53 | 3490 | Ternary star system with red dwarf and (sub-)brown dwarf, found in 2009, found to be planet in 2016 |
| 4 Ursae Majoris b | 7.1 | | 269.3 | 0.87 | | radial vel. | 2006 | 239.99 | 1.23 | 4415 | |
| 6 Lyncis b | 2.01 | | 934.3 | 2.11 | | radial vel. | 2008 | 178.54 | 1.44 | 4938 | |
| 11 Comae Berenices b | 19.4 | | 326.03 | 1.29 | | radial vel. | 2007 | 304.54 | 2.7 | 4742 | |
| 11 Ursae Minoris b | 14.74 | | 516.21997 | 1.53 | | radial vel. | 2009 | 410.06 | 2.78 | 4213 | |
| 14 Andromedae b | 4.8 | | 185.84 | 0.83 | | radial vel. | 2008 | 246.55 | 2.2 | 4813 | Proper name Spe |
| 14 Herculis b | 4.66 | | 1773.4 | 2.93 | | radial vel. | 2002 | 58.51 | 0.9 | 5338 | Another suspected planet confirmed in 2021. |
| 14 Herculis c | 5.8^{+1.4}_{−1.0} | | 25,000^{+23,000}_{−9,000} | 16.4^{+9.3}_{−4.3} | | radial vel. | 2005 | 58.52±0.02 | 0.9 | 5,518±102 | Suspected since 2005 |
| 18 Delphini b | 10.3 | | 993.3 | 2.6 | | radial vel. | 2008 | 249.13 | 2.3 | 4979 | Proper name Arion |
| 23 Librae c | 0.82 | | 5000 | 5.8 | | radial vel. | 2009 | 85.46 | 1.1 | 5736 | |
| 30 Arietis Bb | 13.82 | | 335.1 | 0.99 | | radial vel. | 2009 | 145.83 | 1.93 | 6331 | |
| 41 Lyncis b | 2.7 | | 184.02 | 0.81 | | radial vel. | 2007 | 280.24 | 2.1 | 4753 | Proper name Arkas |
| 42 Draconis b | 3.88 | | 479.1 | 1.19 | | radial vel. | 2008 | 296.36 | 0.98 | 4200 | Proper name Orbitar |
| 47 Ursae Majoris c | 0.54 | | 2391 | 3.6 | | radial vel. | 2001 | 45.01 | 1.03 | 5892 | Proper name Taphao Kaew |
| 47 Ursae Majoris d | 1.64 | | 14002 | 11.6 | | radial vel. | 2009 | 45.01 | 1.03 | 5892 | |
| 54 Piscium b | 0.228 | | 62.25 | 0.295 | | radial vel. | 2003 | 36.34 | 0.8 | 5221 | |
| 55 Cancri c | 0.1714 | | 44.4175 | 0.241376 | | radial vel. | 2004 | 41.06 | 0.91 | 5196 | Proper name Brahe |
| 55 Cancri d | 3.878 | | 4825 | 5.503 | | radial vel. | 2002 | 41.06 | 0.91 | 5196 | Proper name Lipperhey |
| 55 Cancri e | 0.02542 | 0.17 | 0.736539 | 0.01544 | 1958 | radial vel. | 2004 | 41.06 | 0.91 | 5196 | Proper name Janssen |
| 55 Cancri f | 0.141 | | 262 | 0.788 | | radial vel. | 2007 | 41.06 | 0.91 | 5196 | Proper name Harriot |
| 61 Virginis b | 0.016 | | 4.215 | 0.050201 | | radial vel. | 2009 | 27.76 | 0.94 | 5577 | |
| 61 Virginis c | 0.057 | | 38.021 | 0.2175 | | radial vel. | 2009 | 27.76 | 0.94 | 5577 | |
| 61 Virginis d | 0.072 | | 123.01 | 0.476 | | radial vel. | 2009 | 27.76 | 0.94 | 5577 | |
| 79 Ceti b | 0.26 | | 75.523 | 0.36 | | radial vel. | 2000 | 123.39 | 1.11 | 5757 | |
| 81 Ceti b | 5.3 | | 952.7 | 2.5 | | radial vel. | 2008 | 331.16 | 2.4 | 4785 | |
| 83 Leonis Bb | 0.07 | | 17.0431 | 0.12 | | radial vel. | 2004 | 59.4 | 0.48 | 4815 | |
| 91 Aquarii b | 3.2 | | 181.4 | 0.7 | | radial vel. | 2003 | 148.5 | 1.4 | 4665 | |
| 94 Ceti b | 1.37 | | 466.2 | 1.305 | | radial vel. | 2003 | 73.52 | 1.36 | 6188 | |
| AB Pictoris b | 13.5 | | | 260 | | imaging | 2005 | 163.47 | 0.9 | 5378 | |
| BD+14 4559 b | 1.04 | | 268.94 | 0.78 | | radial vel. | 2009 | 161.19 | 0.49 | 4864 | Proper name Pirx |
| BD+20 2457 b | 55.59 | | 379.63 | 1.05 | | radial vel. | 2009 | 5450 | 10.83 | 4259 | |
| BD+20 2457 c | 12.47 | | 621.99 | 2.01 | | radial vel. | 2009 | 5450 | 10.83 | 4259 | |
| BD-08 2823 b | 0.04 | | 5.6 | 0.06 | | radial vel. | 2009 | 134.97 | 0.5 | 4816 | |
| BD-08 2823 c | 0.33 | | 237.6 | 0.68 | | radial vel. | 2009 | 134.97 | 0.5 | 4816 | |
| BD-10 3166 b | 0.59 | | 3.48777 | 0.04 | | radial vel. | 2000 | 275.97 | 1.47 | 5393 | |
| BD-17 63 b | 5.1 | | 655.6 | 1.34 | | radial vel. | 2008 | 112.49 | 0.74 | 4714 | Proper name Finlay |
| Beta Pictoris b | 11.0 | 1.65 | 7665 | 9.1 | 1612 | imaging | 2008 | 64.42 | 1.76 | 7099 | |
| Chi Virginis b | 11.09 | | 835.477 | 2.14 | | radial vel. | 2009 | 329.36 | 2.17 | 4445 | |
| CHXR 73 b | 12.569 | | | 210 | | imaging | 2006 | 623.14 | 0.35 | | |
| CT Chamaeleontis b | 17.0 | 2.2 | | 440 | 2600 | imaging | 2007 | 538.18 | | 4200 | |
| CoRoT-1b | 1.03 | 1.49 | 1.5089557 | 0.02752 | 1898 | transit | 2008 | 2627 | 0.95 | 5950 | |
| CoRoT-2b | 3.47 | 1.466 | 1.7429935 | 0.02798 | 1521 | transit | 2008 | 652.33 | 0.96 | 5625 | |
| CoRoT-3b | 21.66 | 1.01 | 4.2568 | 0.05783 | 1695 | transit | 2008 | 2218 | 1.37 | 6740 | |
| CoRoT-4b | 0.72 | 1.19 | 9.20205 | 0.09 | 1074 | transit | 2008 | 2419 | 1.16 | 6190 | |
| CoRoT-5b | 0.467 | 1.388 | 4.0378962 | 0.04947 | 1438 | transit | 2009 | 2951 | 1.0 | 6100 | |
| CoRoT-6b | 2.96 | 1.166 | 8.886593 | 0.0855 | 1017 | transit | 2009 | 2144 | 1.05 | 6090 | |
| CoRoT-7b | 0.01 | 0.15 | 0.85359163 | 0.017016 | 1756 | transit | 2009 | 523.95 | 0.82 | 5275 | |
| CoRoT-7c | 0.02643 | | 3.698 | 0.046 | | radial vel. | 2009 | 523.95 | 0.82 | 5275 | |
| CoRoT-9b | 0.84 | 1.066 | 95.272656 | 0.4021 | 420 | transit | 2009 | 1363 | 0.96 | 5625 | |
| DH Tauri b | 11.0 | 2.7 | | 330 | 2200 | imaging | 2004 | 456.63 | 0.33 | 3751 | |
| DP Leonis b | 6.28 | | 10220 | 8.19 | | timing | 2009 | 995.01 | 0.69 | 13500 | |
| Epsilon Eridani b | 1.55 | | 2502 | 3.39 | | radial vel. | 2000 | 10.47 | 0.83 | 5136 | Proper name Ægir |
| Epsilon Reticuli b | 1.56 | | 428.1 | 1.271 | | radial vel. | 2000 | 59.62 | 1.23 | 4846 | |
| Epsilon Tauri b | 7.6 | | 594.9 | 1.93 | | radial vel. | 2006 | 160.57 | 2.7 | 4901 | Proper name Amateru |
| Eta2 Hydri b | 6.54 | | 711 | 1.93 | | radial vel. | 2005 | 221.96 | 1.91 | 4970 | |
| FU Tauri b | 16.0 | | | 800 | 2375 | imaging | 2008 | 456.63 | 0.05 | 2838 | |
| Gamma Cephei Ab | 1.85 | | 903.3 | 2.05 | | radial vel. | 2003 | 44.16 | 1.4 | 4744 | Proper name Tadmor |
| Gamma Leonis b | 8.78 | | 428.5 | 1.19 | | radial vel. | 2009 | 125.64 | 1.23 | 4330 | |
| Gliese 176 b | 0.026 | | 8.7836 | 0.066 | 450 | radial vel. | 2008 | 30.89 | 0.45 | 3679 | |
| Gliese 179 b | 0.82 | | 2288 | 2.41 | | radial vel. | 2009 | 40.31 | 0.36 | 3370 | |
| Gliese 317 b | 2.5 | | 692 | 1.15 | | radial vel. | 2007 | 49.25 | 0.42 | 3510 | |
| Gliese 436 b | 0.07 | 0.372 | 2.64388312 | 0.0291 | 686 | radial vel. | 2004 | 31.83 | 0.47 | 3479 | |
| Gliese 581 b | 0.0497 | | 5.3686 | 0.04061 | | radial vel. | 2005 | 20.55 | 0.31 | 3660 | |
| Gliese 581 c | 0.0173 | | 12.914 | 0.0721 | | radial vel. | 2007 | 20.55 | 0.31 | 3660 | |
| Gliese 581 e | 0.0053 | | 3.149 | 0.02815 | | radial vel. | 2009 | 20.55 | 0.31 | 3660 | |
| Gliese 649 b | 0.328 | | 598.3 | 1.135 | | radial vel. | 2009 | 33.86 | 0.54 | 3700 | |
| Gliese 667 Cb | 0.018 | | 7.2004 | 0.0505 | | radial vel. | 2009 | 22.18 | 0.33 | 3350 | |
| Gliese 674 b | 0.035 | | 4.6938 | 0.039 | | radial vel. | 2007 | 14.84 | 0.35 | 3600 | |
| Gliese 777 b | 1.54 | | 2915.03687 | 3.97 | | radial vel. | 2003 | 52.22 | 0.99 | 5552 | |
| Gliese 777 c | 0.06 | | 17.111 | 0.1304 | | radial vel. | 2005 | 52.22 | 0.99 | 5552 | |
| Gliese 832 b | 0.68 | | 3657 | 3.56 | | radial vel. | 2008 | 16.21 | 0.45 | 3472 | |
| Gliese 849 b | 1.0 | | 1882 | 2.35 | | radial vel. | 2006 | 28.7 | 0.65 | 3241 | |
| Gliese 876 c | 0.7142 | | 30.0881 | 0.12959 | | radial vel. | 2000 | 15.26 | 0.32 | 3129 | |
| Gliese 876 d | 0.021 | | 1.93778 | 0.020807 | | radial vel. | 2005 | 15.26 | 0.32 | 3129 | |
| GJ 1214 b | 0.0197 | 0.254 | 1.58040456 | 0.01411 | 547 | transit | 2009 | 47.78 | 0.15 | 3026 | Candidate ocean planet. Proper name Enaiposha. |
| GJ 3021 b | 3.37 | | 133.71 | 0.49 | 350 | radial vel. | 2000 | 57.27 | 0.9 | 5540 | |
| GQ Lupi b | 20.0 | 3.0 | | 100 | 2650 | imaging | 2004 | 495.19 | 0.7 | 4092 | |
| HAT-P-1b | 0.525 | 1.319 | 4.46529976 | 0.05561 | 1322 | transit | 2006 | 520.92 | 1.15 | 5980 | |
| HAT-P-2b | 8.7 | 0.951 | 5.6335158 | 0.06814 | 1540 | transit | 2007 | 418.31 | 1.33 | 6380 | Proper name Magor |
| HAT-P-3b | 0.65 | 0.94 | 2.8997 | 0.03866 | 1189 | transit | 2007 | 440.59 | 1.06 | 5185 | Proper name Teberda |
| HAT-P-4b | 0.671 | 1.274 | 3.056536 | 0.04438 | 1686 | transit | 2007 | 1024 | 0.56 | 5860 | |
| HAT-P-5b | 0.98 | 1.21 | 2.78849 | 0.04073 | 1539 | transit | 2007 | 998.1 | 1.04 | 5960 | Proper name Kráľomoc |
| HAT-P-6b | 1.32 | 1.48 | 3.85298 | 0.05239 | 1675 | transit | 2007 | 905.11 | 1.79 | 6570 | Proper name Nachtwacht |
| HAT-P-7b | 1.84 | 1.51 | 2.20474 | 0.03676 | 2733 | transit | 2008 | 1124 | 1.56 | 6389 | Also known as Kepler-2b |
| HAT-P-8b | 1.28 | 1.4 | 3.07634 | 0.04496 | 1700 | transit | 2008 | 694.21 | 1.27 | 6200 | |
| HAT-P-9b | 0.749 | 1.393 | 3.92281072 | 0.05287 | 1540 | transit | 2008 | 1566 | 1.28 | 6350 | Proper name Alef |
| HAT-P-11b | 0.084 | 0.389 | 4.88780244 | 0.05254 | 838 | transit | 2008 | 123.32 | 0.81 | 4780 | Also known as Kepler-3b |
| HAT-P-12b | 0.211 | 0.959 | 3.2130598 | 0.0384 | 963 | transit | 2009 | 464.79 | 0.73 | 4650 | |
| HAT-P-13b | 0.851 | 1.272 | 2.91625 | 0.04383 | 1740 | transit | 2009 | 698.0 | 1.22 | 5653 | |
| HAT-P-13c | 14.28 | | 446.27 | 1.258 | 340 | radial vel. | 2009 | 698.0 | 1.22 | 5653 | |
| HD 142 b | 1.25 | | 349.7 | 1.02 | | radial vel. | 2001 | 85.49 | 1.23 | 6245 | |
| HD 2039 b | 6.29 | | 1120 | 2.2 | | radial vel. | 2002 | 280.18 | 1.23 | 5945 | |
| HD 2638 b | 0.42 | | 3.4442 | 0.04 | | radial vel. | 2005 | 179.55 | 0.77 | 5186 | |
| HD 4113 b | 1.56 | | 526.62 | 1.28 | | radial vel. | 2007 | 136.73 | 0.99 | 5688 | |
| HD 4203 b | 2.23 | | 431.88 | 1.17 | | radial vel. | 2001 | 266.05 | 1.25 | 5596 | |
| HD 4208 b | 0.81 | | 832.97 | 1.662 | | radial vel. | 2001 | 111.65 | 0.88 | 5717 | Proper name Xolotlan |
| HD 4308 b | 0.05 | | 15.56 | 0.12 | | radial vel. | 2005 | 71.85 | 0.93 | 5686 | |
| HD 4313 b | 1.927 | | 356.21 | 1.157 | | radial vel. | 2009 | 446.26 | 1.63 | 4943 | |
| HD 5319 b | 1.556 | | 637.1 | 1.57 | | radial vel. | 2007 | 397.37 | 1.27 | 4871 | |
| HD 6434 b | 0.49 | | 21.998 | 0.14 | | radial vel. | 2003 | 138.33 | 1.1 | 5769 | Proper name Eyeke |
| HD 6718 b | 1.68 | | 2496 | 3.55 | | radial vel. | 2009 | 167.72 | 1.08 | 5801 | |
| HD 7924 b | 0.02 | | 5.39792 | 0.06 | 826 | radial vel. | 2008 | 55.45 | 0.65 | 5131 | |
| HD 8574 b | 2.03 | | 227 | 0.76 | | radial vel. | 2002 | 146.38 | 1.34 | 6064 | Proper name Bélisama |
| HD 8673 b | 14.2 | | 1634 | 3.02 | | radial vel. | 2009 | 123.62 | 1.35 | 6472 | |
| HD 9446 b | 0.7 | | 30.052 | 0.189 | | radial vel. | 2009 | 164.45 | 1.0 | 5793 | |
| HD 9446 c | 1.82 | | 192.9 | 0.654 | | radial vel. | 2009 | 164.45 | 1.0 | 5793 | |
| HD 11506 b | 4.83 | | 1622.1 | 2.9 | | radial vel. | 2007 | 167.45 | 1.24 | 6030 | |
| HD 11964 b | 0.622 | | 1945 | 3.16 | | radial vel. | 2005 | 109.49 | 1.12 | 5349 | |
| HD 11964 c | 0.0788 | | 37.91 | 0.229 | | radial vel. | 2008 | 109.49 | 1.12 | 5349 | |
| HD 12661 b | 2.43 | | 262.70862 | 0.84 | | radial vel. | 2000 | 123.58 | 1.2 | 5645 | |
| HD 12661 c | 1.812 | | 1708 | 2.8145 | | radial vel. | 2002 | 123.58 | 1.2 | 5645 | |
| HD 13189 b | 10.95 | | 471.6 | 1.25 | | radial vel. | 2005 | 1646 | 2.24 | 4175 | |
| HD 13931 b | 2.2 | | 4218 | 5.15 | | radial vel. | 2009 | 154.8 | 1.3 | 5867 | |
| HD 16175 b | 5.1 | | 990 | 2.12 | | radial vel. | 2009 | 195.57 | 1.63 | 5981 | Proper name Abol |
| HD 16417 b | 0.0696 | | 17.24 | 0.14 | | radial vel. | 2008 | 82.88 | 1.2 | 5841 | |
| HD 17092 b | 10.13 | | 359.9 | 1.31 | | radial vel. | 2007 | 749.83 | 6.73 | 4326 | |
| HD 17156 b | 3.51 | 1.1 | 21.21663 | 0.16278 | 883 | radial vel. | 2007 | 255.26 | 1.41 | 6040 | Proper name Mulchatna |
| HD 20782 b | 1.4878 | | 597.0643 | 1.3649 | | radial vel. | 2006 | 117.49 | 1.07 | 5790 | Has the most eccentric orbit of any known exoplanet |
| HD 20868 b | 1.25 | | 380.85001 | 0.95 | | radial vel. | 2008 | 155.88 | 0.39 | 4802 | Proper name Baiduri |
| HD 23079 b | 2.61 | | 730.6 | 1.6 | | radial vel. | 2001 | 109.23 | 1.12 | 5974 | Proper name Guarani |
| HD 23127 b | 1.527 | | 1211.17 | 2.37 | | radial vel. | 2006 | 306.96 | 1.21 | 5843 | |
| HD 23596 b | 9.03 | | 1561 | 2.77 | | radial vel. | 2003 | 169.87 | 1.47 | 6040 | |
| HD 24040 b | 3.86 | | 3668 | 4.92 | | radial vel. | 2006 | 152.25 | 1.11 | 5802 | |
| HD 27894 b | 0.665 | | 18.02 | 0.125 | | radial vel. | 2005 | 143.12 | 0.8 | 4894 | |
| HD 28185 b | 5.9 | | 379 | 1.02 | | radial vel. | 2001 | 128.61 | 1.02 | 5662 | |
| HD 30177 b | 8.622 | | 2527.83 | 3.704 | | radial vel. | 2002 | 181.61 | 1.05 | 5607 | |
| HD 30562 b | 1.22 | | 1157 | 2.34 | | radial vel. | 2009 | 85.39 | 1.12 | 5882 | |
| HD 32518 b | 3.04 | | 157.54 | 0.59 | | radial vel. | 2009 | 399.72 | 1.13 | 4580 | Proper name Neri |
| HD 33283 b | 0.329 | | 18.1991 | 0.1508 | | radial vel. | 2006 | 293.88 | 1.38 | 5935 | |
| HD 33564 b | 9.1 | | 388 | 1.1 | | radial vel. | 2005 | 68.4 | 1.25 | 6250 | |
| HD 34445 b | 0.82 | | 1049 | 2.07 | | radial vel. | 2009 | 150.53 | 1.14 | 5879 | |
| HD 37124 b | 0.675 | | 154.378 | 0.53364 | | radial vel. | 2002 | 103.36 | 0.85 | 5492 | |
| HD 37124 c | 0.652 | | 885.5 | 1.71 | | radial vel. | 2002 | 103.36 | 0.85 | 5492 | |
| HD 37124 d | 0.696 | | 1862 | 2.807 | | radial vel. | 2005 | 103.36 | 0.85 | 5492 | |
| HD 37605 b | 2.69 | | 55.01292 | 0.277 | | radial vel. | 2004 | 152.81 | 0.94 | 5329 | |
| HD 38529 b | 0.797 | | 14.30944 | 0.1294 | | radial vel. | 2000 | 138.33 | 1.41 | 5541 | |
| HD 38529 c | 12.99 | | 2136.1 | 3.64 | | radial vel. | 2000 | 138.33 | 1.41 | 5541 | |
| HD 38801 b | 9.698 | | 685.25 | 1.623 | | radial vel. | 2009 | 299.03 | 1.21 | 5338 | |
| HD 40307 b | 0.0126 | | 4.3123 | 0.0468 | 910 | radial vel. | 2008 | 42.21 | 0.77 | 4956 | |
| HD 40307 c | 0.0208 | | 9.6184 | 0.0799 | 696 | radial vel. | 2008 | 42.21 | 0.77 | 4956 | |
| HD 40307 d | 0.0299 | | 20.432 | 0.1321 | 541 | radial vel. | 2008 | 42.21 | 0.77 | 4956 | |
| HD 40979 b | 4.67 | | 264.15 | 0.85 | | radial vel. | 2002 | 111.29 | 1.45 | 6165 | |
| HD 41004 Ab | 2.54 | | 963 | | | radial vel. | 2004 | 140.35 | 0.7 | 5010 | |
| HD 41004 Bb | 18.37 | | 1.3283 | | | radial vel. | 2003 | 140.35 | 0.4 | | |
| HD 43691 b | 2.55 | | 36.9987 | 0.238 | | radial vel. | 2007 | 279.88 | 1.32 | 6093 | |
| HD 45350 b | 1.79 | | 963.6 | 1.92 | | radial vel. | 2004 | 153.1 | 1.02 | 5616 | Proper name Peitruss |
| HD 45364 b | 0.1872 | | 226.93 | 0.6813 | | radial vel. | 2008 | 112.17 | 0.82 | 5434 | |
| HD 45364 c | 0.6579 | | 342.85 | 0.8972 | | radial vel. | 2008 | 112.17 | 0.82 | 5434 | |
| HD 45652 b | 0.433 | | 44.073 | 0.237 | | radial vel. | 2008 | 113.8 | 0.92 | 5294 | Proper name Viriato |
| HD 46375 b | 0.226 | | 3.023573 | 0.0398 | | radial vel. | 2000 | 96.48 | 0.92 | 5285 | |
| HD 47186 b | 0.07 | | 4.0845 | 0.05 | | radial vel. | 2008 | 122.31 | 0.96 | 5657 | |
| HD 47186 c | 0.35061 | | 1353.6 | 2.395 | | radial vel. | 2008 | 122.31 | 0.96 | 5657 | |
| HD 47536 b | 7.32 | | 712.13 | 1.93 | | radial vel. | 2002 | 401.02 | 0.91 | 4424 | |
| HD 48265 b | 1.525 | | 778.51 | 1.814 | | radial vel. | 2008 | 296.09 | 1.31 | 5733 | Proper name Naqaỹa |
| HD 49674 b | 0.1 | | 4.94737 | 0.06 | | radial vel. | 2002 | 140.55 | 1.03 | 5602 | Proper name Eburonia |
| HD 50499 b | 1.636 | | 2447.1 | 3.833 | | radial vel. | 2005 | 151.18 | 1.25 | 6102 | |
| HD 50554 b | 4.954 | | 1293 | 2.353 | | radial vel. | 2002 | 101.73 | 1.04 | 5987 | |
| HD 52265 b | 1.21 | | 119.27 | 0.52 | 405 | radial vel. | 2000 | 97.88 | 1.2 | 6136 | Proper name Cayahuanca |
| HD 59686 b | 6.92^{+0.18}_{−0.24} | | 299.36^{+0.26}_{−0.31} | 1.0860^{+0.0006}_{−0.0007} | | radial vel. | 2003 | 292±2 | 1.43±0.23 | 4670±34 | |
| HD 60532 b | 1.06 | | 201.9 | 0.77 | | radial vel. | 2008 | 84.77 | 1.5 | 6245 | |
| HD 60532 c | 2.51 | | 600.1 | 1.6 | | radial vel. | 2008 | 84.77 | 1.5 | 6245 | |
| HD 63454 b | 0.25 | 1.098 | 2.81805 | 0.04 | | radial vel. | 2005 | 123.06 | 0.42 | 4812 | Proper name Ibirapitá |
| HD 63765 b | 0.53 | | 358 | 0.94 | | radial vel. | 2009 | 106.23 | 0.65 | 5449 | Proper name Yvaga |
| HD 65216 b | 1.295 | | 577.6 | 1.301 | | radial vel. | 2003 | 114.68 | 0.87 | 5612 | |
| HD 66428 b | 3.204 | | 2263.12 | 3.467 | | radial vel. | 2005 | 174.04 | 1.08 | 5773 | |
| HD 68988 b | 1.97 | | 6.27711 | 0.07 | | radial vel. | 2001 | 198.8 | 1.28 | 5932 | Proper name Albmi |
| HD 69830 b | 0.0321 | | 8.667 | 0.0785 | | radial vel. | 2006 | 40.97 | 0.86 | 5385 | |
| HD 69830 c | 0.0371 | | 31.56 | 0.186 | | radial vel. | 2006 | 40.97 | 0.86 | 5385 | |
| HD 69830 d | 0.057 | | 197 | 0.63 | | radial vel. | 2006 | 40.97 | 0.86 | 5385 | |
| HD 70573 b | 6.1 | | 851.8 | 1.76 | | radial vel. | 2007 | 149.06 | 1.0 | 5737 | |
| HD 70642 b | 1.993 | | 2124.54 | 3.318 | | radial vel. | 2003 | 95.57 | 1.08 | 5732 | |
| HD 72659 b | 3.85 | | 3658 | 4.75 | | radial vel. | 2002 | 169.51 | 1.43 | 5932 | |
| HD 73267 b | 3.097 | | 1245.36 | 2.187 | | radial vel. | 2008 | 179.1 | 0.9 | 5387 | |
| HD 73526 b | 3.08 | | 188.3 | 0.65 | | radial vel. | 2002 | 318.05 | 1.14 | 5601 | |
| HD 73526 c | 2.25 | | 379.1 | 1.03 | | radial vel. | 2005 | 318.05 | 1.14 | 5601 | |
| HD 73534 b | 1.112 | | 1750 | 2.99 | | radial vel. | 2008 | 272.45 | 1.16 | 4917 | Proper name Drukyul |
| HD 74156 b | 1.8 | | 51.645 | 0.292 | | radial vel. | 2003 | 210.7 | 1.24 | 6068 | |
| HD 74156 c | 8.06 | | 2473 | 3.85 | | radial vel. | 2003 | 210.7 | 1.24 | 6068 | |
| HD 75898 b | 2.71 | | 422.9 | 1.191 | | radial vel. | 2007 | 255.16 | 1.26 | 5963 | Proper name Veles |
| HD 76700 b | 0.21 | | 3.97097 | 0.05 | | radial vel. | 2002 | 198.93 | 0.99 | 5644 | |
| HD 80606 b | 4.38 | 1.07 | 111.4367 | 0.4565 | 405 | radial vel. | 2001 | 217.23 | 1.15 | 5561 | |
| HD 81040 b | 7.27 | | 1001.7 | 1.94 | | radial vel. | 2005 | 112.43 | 1.05 | 5755 | |
| HD 82943 b | 1.681 | | 441.47 | 1.18306 | | radial vel. | 2003 | 90.05 | 1.2 | 6016 | |
| HD 82943 c | 1.959 | | 220.078 | 0.74345 | | radial vel. | 2003 | 90.05 | 1.2 | 6016 | |
| HD 83443 b | 0.34 | | 2.9857 | 0.04 | | radial vel. | 2002 | 133.57 | 0.79 | 5442 | Proper name Buru |
| HD 85390 b | 0.099 | | 799.52 | 1.373 | | radial vel. | 2009 | 109.46 | 0.76 | 5186 | Proper name Madalitso |
| HD 86081 b | 1.48 | | 2.1378431 | 0.0346 | | radial vel. | 2006 | 340.0 | 1.21 | 5939 | Proper name Santamasa |
| HD 86264 b | 7.0 | | 1475 | 2.86 | | radial vel. | 2009 | 221.6 | 1.42 | 6210 | |
| HD 87883 b | 1.54 | | 2754 | 3.58 | | radial vel. | 2009 | 59.69 | 0.66 | 4915 | |
| HD 88133 b | 1.02 | | 3.414884 | 0.0479 | | radial vel. | 2004 | 240.61 | 1.26 | 5392 | |
| HD 89307 b | 2.11 | | 2166 | 3.27 | | radial vel. | 2009 | 104.5 | 1.27 | 5955 | |
| HD 90156 b | 0.057 | | 49.77 | 0.25 | | radial vel. | 2009 | 71.63 | 0.84 | 5599 | |
| HD 92788 b | 3.76 | | 325.803 | 0.97 | | radial vel. | 2000 | 113.15 | 1.15 | 5744 | |
| HD 93083 b | 0.37 | | 143.58 | 0.477 | | radial vel. | 2005 | 93.09 | 0.7 | 4995 | Proper name Melquíades |
| HD 96167 b | 0.717 | | 498.04 | 1.332 | | radial vel. | 2009 | 278.91 | 1.27 | 5733 | |
| HD 99109 b | 0.44 | | 439.3 | 1.11 | | radial vel. | 2005 | 179.0 | 0.76 | 5282 | Proper name Perwana |
| HD 100777 b | 1.03 | | 383.7 | 1.03 | | radial vel. | 2007 | 161.78 | 0.83 | 5533 | Proper name Laligurans |
| HD 101930 b | 0.25 | | 70.46 | 0.3 | | radial vel. | 2005 | 98.01 | 0.57 | 5108 | |
| HD 102117 b | 0.17 | | 20.8133 | 0.15 | | radial vel. | 2005 | 129.23 | 1.06 | 5655 | Proper name Leklsullun |
| HD 102195 b | 0.41 | | 4.11377 | 0.05 | | radial vel. | 2006 | 95.76 | 0.76 | 5301 | Proper name Lete |
| HD 102272 b | 4.94 | | 127.58 | 0.51 | | radial vel. | 2008 | 1142 | 1.45 | 4790 | |
| HD 103197 b | 0.09 | | 47.84 | 0.25 | | radial vel. | 2009 | 186.7 | 0.8 | 5250 | |
| HD 104067 b | 0.16 | | 55.806 | 0.26 | | radial vel. | 2009 | 66.47 | 0.62 | 4937 | |
| HD 104985 b | 8.3 | | 199.505 | 0.95 | | radial vel. | 2003 | 328.97 | 2.3 | 4877 | Proper name Meztli |
| HD 106252 b | 30.6 | | 1531 | 2.61 | | radial vel. | 2002 | 124.69 | 1.05 | 5,890 | Brown dwarf |
| HD 107148 b | 0.21 | | 48.056 | 0.269 | | radial vel. | 2005 | 161.42 | 1.12 | 5797 | |
| HD 108147 b | 0.261 | | 10.8985 | 0.102 | 890 | radial vel. | 2002 | 127.07 | 1.27 | 6265 | Proper name Tumearandu |
| HD 108874 b | 1.42 | | 394.48123 | 1.04 | | radial vel. | 2002 | 194.46 | 1.1 | 5600 | |
| HD 108874 c | 0.99 | | 1624 | 2.659 | | radial vel. | 2005 | 194.46 | 1.1 | 5600 | |
| HD 109749 b | 0.27 | | 5.239891 | 0.0615 | | radial vel. | 2005 | 206.14 | 1.13 | 5824 | |
| HD 111232 b | 7.14 | | 1143 | 1.97 | | radial vel. | 2003 | 94.52 | 0.84 | 5512 | |
| HD 114386 b | 1.14 | | 937.7 | 1.73 | | radial vel. | 2003 | 91.16 | 0.6 | 4836 | |
| HD 114729 b | 0.825 | | 1121.79 | 2.067 | | radial vel. | 2002 | 123.45 | 0.94 | 5844 | |
| HD 114783 b | 1.1 | | 493.7 | 1.16 | | radial vel. | 2001 | 66.54 | 0.85 | 5135 | |
| HD 117207 b | 1.926 | | 2621.75 | 3.787 | | radial vel. | 2004 | 105.61 | 1.05 | 5732 | |
| HD 117618 b | 0.174 | | 25.8 | 0.18 | | radial vel. | 2004 | 123.36 | 1.08 | 5990 | Proper name Noifasui |
| HD 118203 b | 2.79 | | 6.1335 | 0.07 | | radial vel. | 2005 | 301.74 | 1.84 | 5864 | Proper name Staburags |
| HD 121504 b | 1.51 | | 63.33 | 0.33 | | radial vel. | 2003 | 136.04 | 1.62 | 6027 | |
| HD 125595 b | 0.02 | | 9.6737 | 0.08 | | radial vel. | 2009 | 92.04 | 0.29 | 4691 | |
| HD 125612 b | 3.1 | | 557.04 | 1.372 | | radial vel. | 2007 | 188.26 | 1.11 | 5841 | |
| HD 125612 c | 0.055 | | 4.15514 | 0.0524 | | radial vel. | 2009 | 188.26 | 1.11 | 5841 | |
| HD 125612 d | 7.28 | | 2835 | 4.06 | | radial vel. | 2009 | 188.26 | 1.11 | 5841 | |
| HD 126614 Ab | 0.41 | | 1244 | 2.37 | | radial vel. | 2009 | 238.92 | 1.26 | 5568 | |
| HD 128311 b | 1.769 | | 453.019 | 1.084 | | radial vel. | 2002 | 53.88 | 0.83 | 4863 | |
| HD 128311 c | 3.789 | | 921.538 | 1.74 | | radial vel. | 2005 | 53.88 | 0.83 | 4863 | |
| HD 132406 b | 5.38 | | 974 | 1.98 | | radial vel. | 2007 | 231.35 | 1.03 | 5783 | |
| HD 139357 b | 9.76 | | 1125.7 | 2.36 | | radial vel. | 2008 | 366.77 | 1.35 | 4700 | |
| HD 141937 b | 9.69 | | 653.21997 | 1.5 | | radial vel. | 2002 | 108.91 | 1.09 | 5870 | |
| HD 142022 Ab | 4.44 | | 1928 | 2.93 | | radial vel. | 2005 | 111.91 | 0.9 | 5421 | |
| HD 142415 b | 1.67 | | 386.3 | 1.06 | | radial vel. | 2003 | 116.02 | 1.07 | 5940 | |
| HD 143361 b | 3.532 | | 1039.15 | 1.988 | | radial vel. | 2008 | 223.91 | 0.97 | 5507 | |
| HD 145377 b | 6.02 | | 103.95 | 0.45 | | radial vel. | 2008 | 174.73 | 1.2 | 6014 | |
| HD 147018 b | 2.12 | | 44.236 | 0.2388 | | radial vel. | 2009 | 140.12 | 0.93 | 5441 | |
| HD 147018 c | 6.56 | | 1008 | 1.922 | | radial vel. | 2009 | 140.12 | 0.93 | 5441 | |
| HD 147513 b | 1.21 | | 528.4 | 1.32 | | radial vel. | 2003 | 42.11 | 1.11 | 5883 | |
| HD 148156 b | 0.85 | | 1027 | 2.45 | | radial vel. | 2009 | 186.63 | 1.22 | 6308 | |
| HD 148427 b | 1.3 | | 331.5 | 1.04 | | radial vel. | 2009 | 233.21 | 1.64 | 5025 | Proper name Tondra |
| HD 149026 b | 0.38 | 0.74 | 2.87589 | 0.04364 | 1626 | radial vel. | 2005 | 247.98 | 1.42 | 6179 | Proper name Smertrios |
| HD 149143 b | 1.33 | | 4.07182 | 0.053 | | radial vel. | 2005 | 239.5 | 1.2 | 5856 | Proper name Riosar |
| HD 153950 b | 2.95 | | 499.4 | 1.28 | | radial vel. | 2008 | 158.26 | 1.25 | 6124 | Proper name Trimobe |
| HD 154345 b | 0.82 | | 3341.55884 | 4.21 | | radial vel. | 2006 | 59.66 | 0.71 | 5468 | |
| HD 154672 b | 5.37 | | 163.94 | 0.6 | | radial vel. | 2008 | 206.01 | 1.18 | 5743 | |
| HD 154857 b | 2.45 | | 408.6 | 1.29 | | radial vel. | 2004 | 207.31 | 1.96 | 5589 | |
| HD 155358 b | 0.99 | | 194.3 | 0.63 | | radial vel. | 2007 | 142.44 | 1.15 | 5905 | |
| HD 155358 c | 0.82 | | 391.9 | 1.02 | | radial vel. | 2007 | 142.44 | 1.15 | 5905 | |
| HD 156411 b | 0.74 | | 842.2 | 1.88 | | radial vel. | 2009 | 185.78 | 1.25 | 5900 | Proper name Sumajmajta |
| HD 156846 b | 10.67 | | 359.51001 | 1.12 | | radial vel. | 2007 | 155.91 | 1.38 | 6090 | |
| HD 159868 b | 2.218 | | 1184.1 | 2.32 | | radial vel. | 2006 | 182.46 | 1.19 | 5534 | |
| HD 162020 b | 9.84 | | 8.4282 | 0.08 | | radial vel. | 2002 | 100.62 | 0.42 | 4723 | |
| HD 164922 b | 0.31 | | 1155 | 2.1 | 159 | radial vel. | 2005 | 71.82 | 0.76 | 5372 | |
| HD 167042 b | 1.7 | | 420.77 | 1.32 | | radial vel. | 2007 | 162.2 | 1.5 | 4943 | |
| HD 168443 c | 17.193 | | 1749.83 | 2.8373 | | radial vel. | 2000 | 129.39 | 0.99 | 5491 | |
| HD 168746 b | 0.27 | | 6.404 | 0.07 | 900 | radial vel. | 2002 | 135.75 | 1.07 | 5570 | Proper name Onasilos |
| HD 169830 b | 2.88 | | 225.62 | 0.81 | 345 | radial vel. | 2000 | 122.77 | 1.4 | 6299 | |
| HD 169830 c | 4.04 | | 2102 | 3.6 | | radial vel. | 2003 | 122.77 | 1.4 | 6299 | |
| HD 170469 b | 0.66 | | 1145 | 2.24 | | radial vel. | 2007 | 196.61 | 1.1 | 5842 | |
| HD 171028 b | 2.62 | | 550 | 1.32 | | radial vel. | 2007 | 365.34 | 1.53 | 5671 | |
| HD 171238 b | 2.72 | | 1532 | 2.57 | | radial vel. | 2009 | 146.35 | 0.96 | 5440 | |
| HD 173416 b | 2.7 | | 323.6 | 1.16 | | radial vel. | 2008 | 432.76 | 2.0 | 4683 | Proper name Wangshu |
| HD 175541 b | 0.598 | | 298.43 | 0.975 | | radial vel. | 2007 | 424.28 | 1.39 | 5013 | Proper name Kavian |
| HD 178911 Bb | 8.03 | | 71.484 | 0.34 | | radial vel. | 2001 | 133.79 | 1.24 | 5588 | |
| HD 179079 b | 0.081 | | 14.479 | 0.1214 | | radial vel. | 2008 | 227.83 | 1.14 | 5646 | |
| HD 179949 b | 0.916 | | 3.092514 | 0.0443 | | radial vel. | 2000 | 89.63 | 1.21 | 6168 | Proper name Mastika |
| HD 181433 b | 0.02 | | 9.3743 | 0.08 | | radial vel. | 2008 | 87.74 | 0.63 | 4918 | |
| HD 181433 c | 0.64 | | 962 | 1.76 | | radial vel. | 2008 | 87.74 | 0.63 | 4918 | |
| HD 181433 d | 0.54 | | 2172 | 3.0 | | radial vel. | 2008 | 87.74 | 0.63 | 4918 | |
| HD 181720 b | 0.4 | | 956 | 1.85 | | radial vel. | 2009 | 196.71 | 1.03 | 5736 | Proper name Toge |
| HD 183263 b | 3.95 | | 626.51599 | 1.49 | | radial vel. | 2004 | 177.04 | 1.31 | 5948 | |
| HD 183263 c | 3.57 | | 3070 | 4.35 | | radial vel. | 2008 | 177.04 | 1.31 | 5948 | |
| HD 185269 b | 1.01 | | 6.83776 | 0.077 | | radial vel. | 2006 | 169.84 | 1.3 | 5923 | |
| HD 187085 b | 0.836 | | 1019.74 | 2.1 | | radial vel. | 2006 | 149.91 | 1.19 | 6117 | |
| HD 187123 c | 1.99 | | 3810 | 4.89 | | radial vel. | 2008 | 150.1 | 1.0 | 5830 | |
| HD 188015 b | 1.5 | | 461.2 | 1.203 | | radial vel. | 2004 | 165.5 | 1.09 | 5746 | |
| HD 189733 b | 1.13 | 1.13 | 2.21857567 | 0.0313 | 1209 | radial vel. | 2005 | 64.52 | 0.79 | 5052 | |
| HD 190647 b | 1.985 | | 1176.45 | 2.231 | | radial vel. | 2007 | 177.96 | 1.07 | 5656 | |
| HD 190984 b | 3.1 | | 4885 | 5.5 | | radial vel. | 2009 | 485.37 | 0.91 | 5988 | |
| HD 192699 b | 2.096 | | 340.94 | 1.063 | | radial vel. | 2007 | 234.87 | 1.38 | 5041 | Proper name Khomsa |
| HD 196050 b | 3.18 | | 1378 | 2.51 | | radial vel. | 2002 | 165.53 | 1.31 | 5879 | |
| HD 196885 Ab | 2.58 | | 1333 | 2.37 | | radial vel. | 2007 | 111.55 | 1.28 | 6254 | |
| HD 202206 c | 17.9 | | 1260 | 2.41 | | radial vel. | 2004 | 150.13 | 1.27 | 5760 | |
| HD 203030 b | 11^{+4}_{−3} | | | 487.1 | 1040±50 | imaging | 2006 | 128.1±0.3 | 0.965 | 5472 | Discovered as brown dwarf, reclassified as planet |
| HD 205739 b | 1.37 | | 279.8 | 0.896 | | radial vel. | 2008 | 302.49 | 1.22 | 6176 | Proper name Samagiya |
| HD 208487 b | 0.52 | | 130.08 | 0.524 | | radial vel. | 2004 | 143.51 | 1.13 | 6067 | Proper name Mintome |
| HD 210702 b | 1.808 | | 354.1 | 1.148 | | radial vel. | 2007 | 177.04 | 1.61 | 4951 | |
| HD 212301 b | 0.51 | | 2.24571 | 0.03 | | radial vel. | 2005 | 177.17 | 1.55 | 6239 | |
| HD 213240 b | 5.58 | | 882.7 | 1.89 | | radial vel. | 2001 | 133.47 | 1.57 | 5979 | |
| HD 215497 b | 0.02 | | 3.93404 | 0.05 | | radial vel. | 2009 | 132.39 | 0.67 | 5110 | |
| HD 215497 c | 0.33 | | 567.94 | 1.282 | | radial vel. | 2009 | 132.39 | 0.67 | 5110 | |
| HD 216770 b | 0.57 | | 118.45 | 0.46 | | radial vel. | 2003 | 119.7 | 0.74 | 5399 | |
| HD 217107 c | 2.6 | | 4270 | 5.32 | | radial vel. | 2005 | 65.46 | 1.0 | 5622 | |
| HD 219828 b | 0.066 | | 3.83492 | 0.0507 | | radial vel. | 2007 | 238.98 | 1.18 | 5807 | |
| HD 221287 b | 3.09 | | 456.1 | 1.25 | | radial vel. | 2007 | 182.69 | 1.25 | 6304 | Proper name Pipitea |
| HD 224693 b | 0.7 | | 26.6904 | 0.191 | | radial vel. | 2006 | 305.78 | 1.31 | 5894 | Proper name Xólotl |
| HD 231701 b | 1.13 | | 141.63 | 0.567 | | radial vel. | 2007 | 356.24 | 1.21 | 6101 | Proper name Babylonia |
| HD 240210 b | 5.21 | | 501.75 | 1.16 | | radial vel. | 2009 | 465.96 | 0.82 | 4297 | |
| HD 290327 b | 2.43 | | 2443 | 3.43 | | radial vel. | 2009 | 184.35 | 0.84 | 5505 | |
| HD 330075 b | 0.48 | | 3.38773 | 0.04 | 990 | radial vel. | 2004 | 147.95 | 0.47 | 5000 | |
| HIP 5158 b | 1.42 | | 345.72 | 0.89 | | radial vel. | 2009 | 168.56 | 0.78 | 4962 | |
| HIP 14810 b | 3.9 | | 6.673892 | 0.0696 | | radial vel. | 2005 | 164.88 | 1.01 | 5544 | |
| HIP 14810 c | 1.31 | | 147.747 | 0.549 | | radial vel. | 2006 | 164.88 | 1.01 | 5544 | |
| HIP 14810 d | 0.59 | | 981.8 | 1.94 | | radial vel. | 2009 | 164.88 | 1.01 | 5544 | |
| HIP 70849 b | 9.0 | | 17337.5 | 20.25 | | radial vel. | 2009 | 78.51 | 0.63 | 4105 | |
| HIP 79431 b | 2.1 | | 111.7 | 0.36 | | radial vel. | 2009 | 47.42 | 0.42 | 3368 | Proper name Barajeel |
| HN Pegasi b | 21.9987 | 1.051 | | 773 | | imaging | 2006 | 59.13 | 1.1 | 5974 | |
| HR 8799 b | 7.0 | 1.2 | 170000 | 68.0 | 1200 | imaging | 2008 | 128.51 | 1.51 | 7400 | |
| HR 8799 c | 10.0 | 1.2 | 69000 | 38.0 | 1200 | imaging | 2008 | 128.51 | 1.51 | 7400 | |
| HR 8799 d | 10.0 | 1.2 | 37000 | 24.0 | 1300 | imaging | 2008 | 128.51 | 1.51 | 7400 | |
| Iota Draconis b | 8.82 | | 511.098 | 1.275 | | radial vel. | 2002 | 103.3 | 1.05 | 4530 | Proper name Hypatia |
| Kappa Coronae Borealis b | 2.17 | | 1285 | 2.65 | | radial vel. | 2007 | 98.14 | 1.5 | 4871 | |
| Kepler-4b | 0.077 | 0.357 | 3.21346 | 0.0456 | 1650 | transit | 2009 | 1794 | 1.22 | 5857 | |
| Kepler-5b | 2.111 | 1.426 | 3.5484657 | 0.0538 | 1750 | transit | 2009 | 3012 | 1.37 | 6297 | |
| Kepler-6b | 0.668 | 1.304 | 3.2346996 | 0.04852 | 1460 | transit | 2009 | 1948 | 1.21 | 5647 | |
| Kepler-7b | 0.441 | 1.622 | 4.8854892 | 0.06067 | 1630 | transit | 2009 | 3090 | 1.36 | 5933 | |
| Lupus-TR-3b | 0.81 | 0.89 | 3.91405 | 0.0464 | | transit | 2007 | 6523 | 0.87 | 5000 | |
| MOA-2007-BLG-192Lb | 0.01 | | | 0.62 | | microlensing | 2008 | 3262 | 0.06 | | |
| MOA-2007-BLG-400Lb | 0.83 | | | 0.72 | 103 | microlensing | 2008 | 19000 | 0.3 | | |
| MOA-2008-BLG-310Lb | 0.07362 | | | 1.61 | | microlensing | 2009 | 25000 | 0.21 | | |
| Mu Arae b | 1.676 | | 643.25 | 1.497 | | radial vel. | 2000 | 50.91 | 1.08 | 5786 | Proper name Quijote |
| Mu Arae c | 0.03321 | | 9.6386 | 0.09094 | 900 | radial vel. | 2004 | 50.91 | 1.08 | 5786 | Proper name Dulcinea. Designated Mu Arae d by the Exoplanet Archive. |
| Mu Arae d | 0.5219 | | 310.55 | 0.921 | | radial vel. | 2006 | 50.91 | 1.08 | 5786 | Proper name Rocinante. Designated Mu Arae e by the Exoplanet Archive. |
| Mu Arae e | 1.814 | | 4205.8 | 5.235 | | radial vel. | 2004 | 50.91 | 1.08 | 5786 | Proper name Sancho. Designated Mu Arae c by the Exoplanet Archive. |
| OGLE-2003-BLG-235Lb | 2.6 | | | 4.3 | | microlensing | 2004 | 19000 | 0.63 | | |
| OGLE-2005-BLG-071Lb | 3.8 | | | 3.6 | 55 | microlensing | 2005 | 10400 | 0.46 | | |
| OGLE-2005-BLG-169Lb | 0.04436 | | | 3.5 | | microlensing | 2006 | 13000 | 0.69 | | |
| OGLE-2005-BLG-390Lb | 0.017 | | 3285 | 2.6 | 50 | microlensing | 2005 | 22000 | 0.22 | | |
| OGLE-2006-BLG-109Lb | 0.73 | | 1788.5 | 2.3 | 82 | microlensing | 2008 | 4925 | 0.51 | | |
| OGLE-2006-BLG-109Lc | 0.27 | | 4927.5 | 4.5 | 59 | microlensing | 2008 | 4925 | 0.51 | | |
| OGLE-2007-BLG-368Lb | 0.06 | | | 3.3 | | microlensing | 2009 | 19000 | 0.64 | | |
| OGLE-TR-10b | 0.62 | 1.25 | 3.101278 | 0.0434 | 1702 | transit | 2004 | 4521 | 1.14 | 5950 | |
| OGLE-TR-56b | 1.39 | 1.363 | 1.2119189 | 0.02383 | 2212 | transit | 2002 | 922.53 | 1.17 | 6050 | First planet discovered via transit |
| OGLE-TR-111b | 0.55 | 1.019 | 4.0144463 | 0.0473 | 1019 | transit | 2004 | 3578 | 0.85 | 5040 | |
| OGLE-TR-113b | 1.26 | 1.093 | 1.4324752 | 0.02289 | 1342 | transit | 2004 | 1957 | 0.78 | 4790 | |
| OGLE-TR-132b | 1.18 | 1.2 | 1.689868 | 0.03035 | 2013 | transit | 2004 | 8154 | 1.3 | 6210 | |
| OGLE-TR-182b | 1.01 | 1.13 | 3.9791 | 0.051 | 1550 | transit | 2007 | 8707 | 1.14 | 5924 | |
| OGLE-TR-211b | 1.03 | 1.36 | 3.67724 | 0.051 | 1686 | transit | 2007 | 5136 | 1.33 | 6325 | |
| OGLE2-TR-L9b | 4.5 | 1.61 | 2.4855335 | 0.0308 | 2034 | transit | 2008 | 5559 | 1.52 | 6933 | |
| Oph 11 b | 14.0 | | 7300000 | 243 | 2175 | imaging | 2006 | 407.71 | 0.02 | 2375 | |
| Pi Mensae b | 10.02 | | 2093.07 | 3.1 | | radial vel. | 2001 | 59.62 | 1.09 | 6037 | |
| Pollux b | 2.3 | | 589.64 | 1.64 | | radial vel. | 2006 | 33.73 | 2.1 | 4946 | Proper name Thestias |
| q1 Eridani b | 0.94 | | 989.2 | 2.015 | | radial vel. | 2006 | 56.56 | 1.11 | 6218 | |
| Rho Indi b | 2.223 | | 1334.28 | 2.497 | | radial vel. | 2002 | 87.12 | 1.17 | 5909 | |
| SWEEPS-04b | 3.8 | 0.81 | 4.2 | 0.055 | | transit | 2006 | 28000 | 1.24 | | |
| SWEEPS-11b | 9.7 | 1.13 | 1.796 | 0.03 | | transit | 2006 | 28000 | 1.1 | | |
| Tau Geminorum b | 20.6 | | 305.5 | 1.17 | | radial vel. | 2003 | 301.7 | 2.3 | 4388 | |
| Tau1 Gruis b | 1.26 | | 1311 | 2.56 | | radial vel. | 2002 | 107.67 | 1.3 | 5999 | |
| TrES-1b | 0.84 | 1.13 | 3.03007 | 0.03925 | 1140 | transit | 2004 | 523.14 | 1.04 | 5230 | |
| TrES-2b | 1.49 | 1.36 | 2.47063 | 0.03563 | 1466 | transit | 2006 | 706.67 | 1.36 | 5850 | Also known as Kepler-1b |
| TrES-3b | 1.91 | 1.336 | 1.30618581 | 0.02282 | 1638 | transit | 2007 | 743.66 | 0.93 | 5650 | Proper name Umbäässa |
| TrES-4b | 0.78 | 1.61 | 3.55395 | 0.05084 | 1778 | transit | 2007 | 1708 | 1.08 | 6200 | |
| UScoCTIO 108 b | 14.0 | | | 670 | | imaging | 2008 | 470.63 | 0.06 | 2700 | |
| V391 Pegasi b | 3.2 | | 1170 | 1.7 | | timing | 2007 | 4566 | 0.5 | 29300 | |
| WASP-1b | 0.854 | 1.483 | 2.5199454 | 0.03889 | 1812 | transit | 2007 | 1296 | 1.24 | 6252 | |
| WASP-2b | 0.931 | 1.081 | 2.152175 | 0.03144 | 1311 | transit | 2007 | 501.94 | 0.9 | 5180 | |
| WASP-3b | 2.43 | 1.42 | 1.84683 | 0.0315 | 2020 | transit | 2007 | 758.99 | 1.62 | 6400 | |
| WASP-4b | 1.186 | 1.321 | 1.33823147 | 0.0226 | 1673 | transit | 2007 | 878.07 | 0.86 | 5400 | |
| WASP-5b | 1.58 | 1.087 | 1.6284279 | 0.0267 | 1706 | transit | 2008 | 1018 | 0.96 | 5700 | |
| WASP-6b | 0.37 | 1.03 | 3.36101 | 0.04217 | 1184 | transit | 2009 | 646.56 | 0.55 | 5450 | Proper name Boinayel |
| WASP-7b | 0.96 | 1.33 | 4.9546416 | 0.0617 | 1487 | transit | 2008 | 531.82 | 1.28 | 6400 | |
| WASP-10b | 3.15 | 1.08 | 3.0927616 | 0.03781 | 1370 | transit | 2008 | 461.75 | 0.75 | 4675 | |
| WASP-11b | 0.79 | 1.11 | 3.72247 | 0.0435 | 992 | transit | 2008 | 408.1 | 1.42 | 4800 | |
| WASP-12b | 1.465 | 1.937 | 1.09142 | 0.0232 | 2593 | transit | 2008 | 1411 | 1.43 | 6360 | |
| WASP-13b | 0.36 | 1.22 | 4.35301 | 0.05362 | 1531 | transit | 2009 | 746.89 | 0.72 | 5950 | Proper name Cruinlagh |
| WASP-14b | 8.84 | 1.38 | 2.24375 | 0.037 | 1872 | transit | 2008 | 530.84 | 1.62 | 6475 | |
| WASP-15b | 0.54 | 1.41 | 3.7521 | 0.05165 | 1676 | transit | 2009 | 927.46 | 1.18 | 6300 | Proper name Asye |
| WASP-16b | 1.24 | 1.22 | 3.1186 | 0.0415 | 1389 | transit | 2009 | 636.68 | 1.78 | 5700 | |
| WASP-17b | 0.78 | 1.87 | 3.73543 | 0.0515 | 1755 | transit | 2009 | 1339 | 2.28 | 6550 | Proper name Ditsö̀ |
| WASP-18b | 10.42954 | 1.191 | 0.94124 | 0.02 | 2413 | transit | 2009 | 404.19 | 1.22 | 6400 | |
| WASP-19b | 1.069 | 1.392 | 0.78883899 | 0.01634 | 2520 | transit | 2009 | 881.99 | 0.9 | 5568 | Proper name Banksia |
| Xi Aquilae b | 2.8 | | 136.75 | 0.68 | | radial vel. | 2007 | 183.53 | 2.2 | 4780 | Proper name Fortitudo |
| XO-1b | 0.83 | 1.14 | 3.94153 | 0.0488 | 1210 | transit | 2006 | 535.99 | 0.88 | 5750 | Proper name Negoiu |
| XO-2Nb | 0.566 | 0.993 | 2.61586178 | 0.0368 | 1328 | transit | 2007 | 505.36 | 0.97 | 5307 | |
| XO-3b | 7.29 | 1.41 | 3.19154 | 0.04529 | 1729 | transit | 2007 | 699.01 | 0.58 | 6429 | |
| XO-4b | 1.42 | 1.25 | 4.12508 | 0.05524 | 1630 | transit | 2008 | 896.27 | 1.1 | 6397 | Proper name Hämarik |
| XO-5b | 1.19 | 1.14 | 4.1877558 | 0.0515 | 1230 | transit | 2008 | 907.95 | 1.04 | 5430 | Proper name Makropulos |

== Former candidates ==
The companion to HD 131664 (discovered in 2008) has been shown to have a true mass much greater than its minimum mass, and is thus a low-mass star rather than a planet. Similarly, a 2017 study showed 2MASS J21402931+1625183 b to actually have a mass of 69^{+8}_{−9} M_{J}, making it a high-mass brown dwarf or a low-mass red dwarf.

== Specific exoplanet lists ==
Lists of exoplanets

- List of directly imaged exoplanets
- List of exoplanet extremes
- List of exoplanet firsts
- List of exoplanets discovered by the Kepler space telescope
- List of exoplanets observed during Kepler's K2 mission
- List of exoplanets discovered by the TESS mission
- List of terrestrial exoplanet candidates for atmosphere detection
- List of hottest exoplanets
- List of coldest exoplanets
- List of multiplanetary systems
- List of circumbinary planets
- List of nearest exoplanets
- List of nearest terrestrial exoplanet candidates
- List of potentially habitable exoplanets
- List of proper names of exoplanets
- List of largest exoplanets
- List of smallest exoplanets
- List of transiting exoplanets
- List of exoplanets and planetary debris around giant stars
- List of exoplanets and planetary debris around white dwarfs
- List of extrasolar planetary collisions

=== Lists of exoplanets by year of discovery ===
- List of exoplanets discovered before 2000 (31)
- List of exoplanets discovered between 2000–2009 (376)
- List of exoplanets discovered in 2010 (109)
- List of exoplanets discovered in 2011 (178)
- List of exoplanets discovered in 2012 (149)
- List of exoplanets discovered in 2013 (149)
- List of exoplanets discovered in 2014 (869)
- List of exoplanets discovered in 2015 (144)
- List of exoplanets discovered in 2016 (1497)
- List of exoplanets discovered in 2017 (152)
- List of exoplanets discovered in 2018 (300)
- List of exoplanets discovered in 2019 (169)
- List of exoplanets discovered in 2020 (256)
- List of exoplanets discovered in 2021 (253)
- List of exoplanets discovered in 2022 (312)
- List of exoplanets discovered in 2023 (304)
- List of exoplanets discovered in 2024 (284)
- List of exoplanets discovered in 2025 (239)
- List of exoplanets discovered in 2026 (339)
