= HD 43848 =

Star in the constellation Columba

Observation data Epoch J2000.0 Equinox ICRS
- Constellation: Columba
- Right ascension: 06^{h} 16^{m} 31.35599^{s}
- Declination: −40° 31′ 54.8276″
- Apparent magnitude (V): 8.65

Characteristics
- Spectral type: K2 IV

Astrometry
Proper motion (μ)	RA: +121.719 mas/yr Dec.: +200.617 mas/yr
Parallax (π)	26.7558±0.0804 mas
Distance	121.9 ± 0.4 ly (37.4 ± 0.1 pc)
Absolute magnitude (M_{V})	+5.76

Details
Mass	0.98 M_{☉}
Radius	0.87 R_{☉}
Luminosity	0.50 L_{☉}
Surface gravity (log g)	4.55 cgs
Temperature	5,140 K
Metallicity [Fe/H]	+0.31 dex
Rotational velocity (v sin i)	2.5 km/s
Age	3.7±1.7 Gyr

Other designations
- CD−40°2356, HIP 29804, LTT 2505, NLTT 16340, SAO 217824

Database references
SIMBAD	data

HD 43848 is a 9th magnitude K-type subgiant star located 122 light-years away in the constellation of Columba. The star is less massive than the Sun.

On October 29, 2008, radial velocity measurements made with the MIKE echelle spectrograph on the 6.5-m Magellan II (Clay) telescope revealed the presence of a companion of at least 25 Jupiter masses orbiting the star. Initially thought to be a brown dwarf, astrometric measurements reveal that the true mass of the object is 120^{+167}_{−43} Jupiter masses, implying that it is likely to be a red dwarf star.

== See also ==
- BD−17°63 b
- HD 131664
- HD 145377 b
- HD 153950 b
- HD 20868 b
- HD 73267 b
