= HD 153950 b =

Extrasolar planet located approximately 162 light years away

HD 153950 b / Trimobe
Discovery
- Discovered by: Moutou et al.
- Discovery site: La Silla Observatory
- Discovery date: October 26, 2008
- Detection method: Doppler spectroscopy (HARPS)

Orbital characteristics
- Semi-major axis: 1.28 ± 0.01 AU (191,500,000 ± 1,500,000 km)
- Eccentricity: 0.34 ± 0.021
- Orbital period (sidereal): 499.4 ± 3.6 d 1.367 ± 0.010 y
- Average orbital speed: 28.0
- Time of periastron: 2,454,502 ± 4.1
- Argument of periastron: 308.2 ± 2.4
- Star: HD 153950

HD 153950 b, also known as Trimobe, is an extrasolar planet located approximately 162 light-years away. This planet was discovered on October 26, 2008 by Moutou et al. using the HARPS spectrograph on ESO's 3.6 meter telescope installed at La Silla Observatory in Atacama Desert, Chile.

The planet HD 153950 b is named Trimobe. The name was selected in the NameExoWorlds campaign by Madagascar, during the 100th anniversary of the IAU. Trimobe is a rich ogre from Malagasy tales.

== Characteristics ==
=== Mass and orbit ===
HD 153950 b is a Jupiter-size exoplanet. The estimated minimum mass is 2.73 times the mass of Jupiter. The planet has been found to orbit its host star every 500 days at a distance of 1.28 AU, which is approximately 28% more of the mean distance between the Sun and the Earth. HD 153950 b has a mildly elliptical orbit, given its orbital eccentricity of 0.34.

=== Temperature ===
The temperature of the exoplanet is likely to vary during its orbit, temperatures would likely range from 275–375 K (2–102 °C; 35–215 °F) as it approaches its periastron/apastron of its orbit. This would also likely apply to a potentially habitable hypothetical moon orbiting the gas giant exoplanet (see below).

=== Host star ===
HD 153950 is an F-type star with a mass that is 1.13 times the mass of the Sun and a size that is 1.34 times the radius of the Sun. In other words, it is slightly more massive and slightly larger than the Sun is. With an effective temperature of 6076 K, HD 205739 is also hotter than the Sun, although it is younger, at an estimated age of 4.3 billion years, 250–300 million years younger than the Sun. The star is almost the same as the Sun in terms of metal; its measured metallicity is [Fe/H] = -0.01. HD 153950 cannot be seen from Earth with the naked eye because the star has an apparent magnitude (V) of 7.39.

== Habitability ==
HD 153950 b is located within the habitable zone of its star. The exoplanet, with a mass of 2.73 M_{J}, is too massive to be rocky, and because of this the planet itself is not expected to habitable. However, based on a probable 10^{−4} fraction of the planet mass as a satellite, it may have a large enough moon with a sufficient atmosphere and pressure, and liquid water at its surface, potentially making it habitable. On the other hand, this mass can be distributed into many small satellites as well.

== Discovery ==
HD 153950's designation is from the Henry Draper catalogue. The star was also observed by Hipparcos, which released its catalogue in 1997. The observations that led to the discovery of the planet HD 153950 b started when the N2K Consortium started an extended search for planets around 300 stars not usually targeted by Doppler spectroscopy surveys. In the case of HD 153950, the star was observed using telescopes at the La Silla Observatory in Chile.

== See also ==
- BD-17°63 b
- HD 131664
- HD 143361 b
- HD 145377 b
- HD 20868 b
- HD 43848
- HD 48265 b
- HD 73267 b
