= HD 73267 =

Star in the constellation Pyxis

Observation data Epoch J2000 Equinox ICRS
- Constellation: Pyxis
- Right ascension: 08^{h} 36^{m} 17.77623^{s}
- Declination: −34° 27′ 35.9196″
- Apparent magnitude (V): 8.889

Characteristics
- Evolutionary stage: main sequence
- Spectral type: G5V
- Apparent magnitude (J): 7.493±0.023
- Apparent magnitude (H): 7.126±0.031
- Apparent magnitude (K): 7.062±0.023
- B−V color index: 0.827±0.003

Astrometry
Radial velocity (R_{v})	+51.836±0.0011 km/s
Proper motion (μ)	RA: −106.336±0.012 mas/yr Dec.: 123.293±0.013 mas/yr
Parallax (π)	19.9362±0.0130 mas
Distance	163.6 ± 0.1 ly (50.16 ± 0.03 pc)
Absolute magnitude (M_{V})	5.24

Details
Mass	0.897±0.019 M_{☉}
Radius	0.909±0.033 R_{☉}
Luminosity	0.783±0.09 L_{☉}
Surface gravity (log g)	74.447±0.035 cgs
Temperature	5,387±10 K
Metallicity [Fe/H]	0.07±0.04 dex
Rotation	~43 d
Rotational velocity (v sin i)	1.65 km/s
Age	8.140±3.505 Gyr

Other designations
- CD−34°5039, HD 73267, HIP 42202, SAO 199418, PPM 285436, NLTT 19895, GSC 07144-01553, 2MASS J08361779-3427358

Database references
SIMBAD	data
Exoplanet Archive	data

HD 73267 is a star in the southern constellation Pyxis, near the western constellation border with Puppis. It has an apparent visual magnitude of 8.889 and can be viewed with a small telescope. The distance to HD 73267 is 164 light years based on parallax, and it is drifting further away with a radial velocity of +51.8 km/s. It has an absolute magnitude of 5.24.

This object is a G-type main-sequence star with a stellar classification of G5V. It is roughly eight billion years old with a near-solar metallicity and is spinning with a projected rotational velocity of 1.65 km/s, giving it a rotation period of around 33 days. The star has 90% of the mass and size of the Sun. It is radiating 78% of the Sun's luminosity from its photosphere at an effective temperature of 5387 K.

== Planetary system ==
In October 2008, a candidate planet was discovered orbiting this star. This object was detected using the radial velocity method by search programs conducted using the HARPS spectrograph. Subsequent analysis of collected data suggests the presence of an additional long-period planet in the system with at least 83% of the mass of Jupiter. In 2022, the inclination and true mass of HD 73267 b were measured, and the presence of a second planet was confirmed using a combination of radial velocity and astrometry.

The HD 73267 planetary system
Companion (in order from star)	Mass	Semimajor axis (AU)	Orbital period (years)	Eccentricity	Inclination (°)	Radius
b	4.158+0.681 −0.519 M_{J}	2.229+0.091 −0.100	3.444+0.001 −0.002	0.261±0.004	130.843+7.614 −7.660	—
c	5.131+0.912 −0.282 M_{J}	12.688+0.631 −0.812	46.740+2.150 −2.977	0.089+0.023 −0.022	91.849+18.586 −24.998	—

== See also ==
- List of extrasolar planets
