= BD−17 63 =

Star in the constellation Cetus

BD-17 63 / Felixvarela
Observation data Epoch J2000 Equinox ICRS
- Constellation: Cetus
- Right ascension: 00^{h} 28^{m} 34.306^{s}
- Declination: −16° 13′ 34.84″
- Apparent magnitude (V): 9.62

Characteristics
- Evolutionary stage: main sequence
- Spectral type: K4V(k)
- Apparent magnitude (B): 10.748
- Apparent magnitude (J): 7.574±0.019
- Apparent magnitude (H): 7.027±0.033
- Apparent magnitude (K): 6.914±0.024
- B−V color index: 1.128±0.010

Astrometry
Radial velocity (R_{v})	2.93±0.15 km/s
Proper motion (μ)	RA: −354.939(22) mas/yr Dec.: −227.995(15) mas/yr
Parallax (π)	28.9723±0.0212 mas
Distance	112.58 ± 0.08 ly (34.52 ± 0.03 pc)
Absolute magnitude (M_{V})	6.86

Details
Mass	0.72±0.01 M_{☉}
Radius	0.70±0.01 R_{☉}
Luminosity	0.212±0.001 L_{☉}
Surface gravity (log g)	4.6±0.01 cgs
Temperature	4,692±9 K
Metallicity [Fe/H]	−0.03±0.06 dex
Rotational velocity (v sin i)	1.5 km/s
Age	10.5±2.6 Gyr; 4.3±4 Gyr

Other designations
- Felixvarela, HIP 2247, SAO 147293, PPM 208851, 2MASS J00283433-1613343

Database references
SIMBAD	data
Exoplanet Archive	data

BD−17 63 is a K-type main-sequence star in the southern constellation Cetus. It is a 10th magnitude star at a distance of 113 light-years from Earth. The star is rotating slowly with a negligible level of magnetic activity and an age of over 4 billion years.

The star BD-17 63 is named Felixvarela. The name was selected in the NameExoWorlds campaign by Cuba, during the 100th anniversary of the IAU. Félix Varela (1788–1853) was the first to teach science in Cuba.

== Planetary system ==
In October 2008 an exoplanet, BD−17 63 b, was reported to be orbiting this star on an eccentric orbit. This object was detected using the radial velocity method by search programs conducted using the HARPS spectrograph. An astrometric measurement of the planet's inclination and true mass was published in 2022 as part of Gaia DR3, with another astrometric orbital solution published in 2023.

The BD−17 63 planetary system
Companion (in order from star)	Mass	Semimajor axis (AU)	Orbital period (days)	Eccentricity	Inclination (°)	Radius
b / Finlay	5.325±0.036 M_{J}	1.361±0.021	655.641+0.070 −0.076	0.5455±0.0025	82.4+2.8 −2.0	—

== See also ==
- List of extrasolar planets
