= HD 20868 =

Star in the constellation Fornax

HD 20868 / Intan
Observation data Epoch J2000 Equinox ICRS
- Constellation: Fornax
- Right ascension: 03^{h} 20^{m} 42.69371^{s}
- Declination: −33° 43′ 48.3735″
- Apparent magnitude (V): 9.92

Characteristics
- Spectral type: K3/4 III/V
- Apparent magnitude (B): 11.07
- Apparent magnitude (J): 8.138±0.032
- Apparent magnitude (H): 7.641±0.031
- Apparent magnitude (K): 7.543±0.015
- B−V color index: 1.037±0.005

Astrometry
Radial velocity (R_{v})	46.207±0.0011 km/s
Proper motion (μ)	RA: 292.619 mas/yr Dec.: 96.116 mas/yr
Parallax (π)	20.9561±0.0128 mas
Distance	155.64 ± 0.10 ly (47.72 ± 0.03 pc)
Absolute magnitude (M_{V})	6.61

Details
Mass	0.76±0.02 M_{☉}
Radius	0.73±0.01 R_{☉}
Luminosity	0.255±0.002 L_{☉}
Surface gravity (log g)	4.59±0.02 cgs
Temperature	4,811±14 K
Metallicity [Fe/H]	0.04±0.1 dex
Age	8.4±3.7 Gyr

Other designations
- Intan, CD−34°1218, HD 20868, HIP 15578, PPM 278952, LTT 1589, 2MASS J03204266-3343484

Database references
SIMBAD	data
Exoplanet Archive	data

HD 20868 is a star in the southern constellation Fornax. With an apparent visual magnitude of 9.92, it is much too dim to be visible to the naked eye. Parallax measurements give a distance estimate of 156 light-years from the Sun. It is drifting further away with a radial velocity of +46.2 km/s, having come to within about 124 ly around 312,000 years ago.

This object is a K-type star with a stellar classification of K3/4 III/V. The luminosity class is poorly constrained; the star's evolutionary status appear to be either main sequence or a giant star. It is around eight billion years old with 76% of the mass of the Sun and 73% of the Sun's radius. It is radiating 25.5% of the luminosity of the Sun from its photosphere at an effective temperature of 4,811 K. The metallicity of the star is near solar, meaning it has about the same abundance of iron as in the Sun. Its properties are consistent with those of a main sequence star.

The star HD 20868 is named Intan. The name was selected in the NameExoWorlds campaign by Malaysia, during the 100th anniversary of the IAU. Intan means diamond in the Malay language.

== Planetary system ==
In October 2008 a planet, HD 20868 b, was discovered. This object was detected using the radial velocity method by search programs conducted using the HARPS spectrograph. The orbital solution indicates this is a giant planet in a highly elliptical orbit around the host star.

The HD 20868 planetary system
Companion (in order from star)	Mass	Semimajor axis (AU)	Orbital period (days)	Eccentricity	Inclination (°)	Radius
b / Baiduri	≥1.99±0.05 M_{J}	0.947±0.012	380.85±0.09	0.75±0.002	—	—

== See also ==
- List of extrasolar planets
