= HD 73267 b =

Extrasolar planet in the constellation Pyxis

Discovery
- Discovered by: Moutou et al.
- Discovery site: La Silla Observatory
- Discovery date: October 26, 2008
- Detection method: Doppler spectroscopy (HARPS)

Orbital characteristics
- Semi-major axis: 2.229+0.091 −0.100 AU
- Eccentricity: 0.261±0.004
- Orbital period (sidereal): 3.444+0.001 −0.002 yr
- Inclination: 130.843°+7.614° −7.660°
- Longitude of ascending node: 196.849°+116.633° −131.558°
- Time of periastron: 2,451,822.849+2.662 −2.959
- Argument of periastron: 228.102°+0.836° −0.823°
- Semi-amplitude: 64.237+0.303 −0.267 m/s
- Star: HD 73267

Physical characteristics
- Mass: 4.158+0.681 −0.519 M_{J}

HD 73267 b is an extrasolar planet located approximately 164 light-years away. This planet was discovered on October 26, 2008 by Moutou et al. using the HARPS spectrograph on ESO's 3.6-meter telescope installed at La Silla Observatory in Atacama Desert, Chile. In 2022, the inclination and true mass of HD 73267 b were measured via astrometry.

== See also ==
- BD-17°63 b
- HD 131664
- HD 143361 b
- HD 145377 b
- HD 153950 b
- HD 20868 b
- HD 43848
- HD 48265 b
- HD 73256 b
