= HD 290327 b =

Exoplanet in the constellation Orion

Discovery
- Discovered by: Naef et al.
- Discovery site: La Silla Observatory
- Discovery date: October 19, 2009
- Detection method: radial velocity (HARPS)

Orbital characteristics
- Semi-major axis: 3.35 AU (501,000,000 km)
- Orbital period (sidereal): 2443 d 6.69 y
- Star: HD 290327

HD 290327 b (also known as HIP 25191 b) is an extrasolar planet which orbits the G-type subgiant star HD 290327, located approximately 180 light years away in the constellation Orion. This planet has at least five halves the mass of Jupiter and takes 6.7 years to orbit the star at a semimajor axis of 3.35 AU. However unlike most other known exoplanets, its eccentricity is not known, but it is typical that its inclination is not known. This planet was detected by HARPS on October 19, 2009, together with 29 other planets.
