= BD−17 63 b =

Extrasolar planet in the constellation Cetus

BD-17°63 b / Finlay
Discovery
- Discovered by: Moutou et al.
- Discovery site: La Silla Observatory
- Discovery date: October 26, 2008
- Detection method: Doppler spectroscopy (HARPS)

Designations
- Alternative designations: Finlay

Orbital characteristics
- Semi-major axis: 1.361±0.021 AU
- Eccentricity: 0.5455±0.0025
- Orbital period (sidereal): 655.641+0.070 −0.076 d
- Inclination: 82.4°+2.8° −2.0°
- Longitude of ascending node: 127.0°+5.1° −3.6°
- Time of periastron: 2,457,249.6+0.36 −0.32 JD
- Argument of periastron: 112.41°±0.43°
- Semi-amplitude: 173.35+0.76 −0.69 m/s
- Star: BD−17 63

Physical characteristics
- Mass: 5.325±0.036 M_{J}

BD-17°63 b, formally named Finlay, is an exoplanet located approximately 112.5 light-years away in the constellation of Cetus, orbiting the 10th magnitude K-type main sequence star BD−17 63. This planet has a minimum mass of 5.1 M_{J} and orbits at a distance of 1.34 astronomical units from the star. The distance ranges from 0.62 AU to 2.06 AU, corresponding to the eccentricity of 0.54. One revolution takes about 656 days.

This planet was discovered on October 26, 2008 by Moutou et al. using the HARPS spectrograph on ESO’s 3.6 meter telescope installed at La Silla Observatory in Atacama Desert, Chile.

The planet BD-17 63 b is named Finlay. The name was selected in the NameExoWorlds campaign by Cuba, during the 100th anniversary of the IAU. Carlos Juan Finlay (1833–1915) was an epidemiologist recognized as a pioneer in the research of yellow fever.

An astrometric measurement of the planet's inclination and true mass was published in 2022 as part of Gaia DR3, with another astrometric orbital solution published in 2023.

== See also ==
- HD 143361 b
- HD 145377 b
- HD 153950 b
- HD 20868 b
- HD 43848
- HD 48265 b
- HD 73267 b
