= HD 96700 =

Star in the constellation Hydra

Observation data Epoch J2000.0 Equinox ICRS
- Constellation: Hydra
- Right ascension: 11^{h} 07^{m} 54.427^{s}
- Declination: −30° 10′ 28.45″
- Apparent magnitude (V): 6.51

Characteristics
- Spectral type: G0 V
- B−V color index: 0.606

Astrometry
Radial velocity (R_{v})	12.839±0.0105 km/s
Proper motion (μ)	RA: −505.371 mas/yr Dec.: −132.293 mas/yr
Parallax (π)	39.3975±0.0208 mas
Distance	82.79 ± 0.04 ly (25.38 ± 0.01 pc)

Details
Mass	1.00±0.01 M_{☉}
Radius	1.142+0.015 −0.016 R_{☉}
Luminosity	1.45 L_{☉}
Surface gravity (log g)	4.33±0.02 cgs
Temperature	5,878±6 K
Metallicity [Fe/H]	−0.189±0.004 dex
Age	6.80+0.64 −0.24 Gyr

Other designations
- CD−29°8875, GJ 412.2, HD 96700, HIP 54400, HR 4328, SAO 179558

Database references
SIMBAD	data
Exoplanet Archive	data
ARICNS	data

HD 96700 is a star in the equatorial constellation of Hydra. It has an apparent visual magnitude of 6.51, which puts it below the limit that can be seen with the naked eye by a typical observer. (According to the Bortle scale, it is possible for some observers to see it from dark rural skies.) Based upon parallax measurements, this star is around 83 light years away from the Sun. It is drifting further away with a radial velocity of 12.8 km/s.

This is considered a high proper motion star, shifting its position across the celestial sphere at a rate of 0.52 arc seconds per year, along a position angle of 255.21°. It is a member of the thin disk population of stars and is orbiting the galactic core at a mean galactocentric distance of 23.4 kly (7.17 kpc) with an orbital eccentricity 0.16. The inclination of its galactic orbit carries it no more than 950 ly (290 pc) away from the galactic plane.

HD 96700 is a G-type main sequence star with a stellar classification of G0 V. It has the same mass than the Sun and a lower metallicity. The estimated size is 114% that of the Sun. The effective temperature of the star's outer atmosphere is 5,878 K, giving it the yellow-hued glow of a G-type star. It has an estimated age of 6.8 billion years.

Together with the proper motion companion CD-27 7781, HD 96700 make a wide binary system. At an angular distance of 6,867", the projected separation between both stars is of 174,000 AU (2.75 light-years). The companion is a K-type main-sequence star of K6V spectral type. The existence of any additional stellar companions at projected distances from 7 to 209 astronomical units is ruled out.

== Planetary system ==
Two planetary companions have been discovered by the HARPS instrument, which measures variations in the star's radial velocity that are presumed to be caused by gravitational perturbations from orbiting objects. The innermost planet, HD 96700 b, is orbiting close to the star at a distance of roughly 0.08 AU with a brief orbital period of 8.13 days. It has at least nine times the mass of the Earth, and so may be a Neptune-like planet. But until astronomers can determine the orbital inclination or directly image the planet, there is no way to know for certain its actual mass.

The second companion, HD 96700 d, is orbiting at roughly the same distance as Mercury from the Sun, with a semimajor axis of 0.42 AU and a period of around 103 days. It may have a relatively high eccentricity of 0.4. This object has at least 13 times the mass of the Earth. A 2017 study found that HD 96700 b does not transit its host star. The existence of both planets was confirmed in 2021, and an additional planetary companion orbiting between them was found, but in 2026 it was found that the radial velocity signal attributed to this planet is likely correlated with stellar activity indicators, making its existence uncertain.

The HD 96700 planetary system
Companion (in order from star)	Mass	Semimajor axis (AU)	Orbital period (days)	Eccentricity	Inclination (°)	Radius
b	≥8.9±0.4 M_{🜨}	0.0777±0.0013	8.1245±0.0006	<0.138	—	—
c (disputed)	≥3.5±0.4 M_{🜨}	0.141±0.002	19.88±0.01	<0.293	—	—
d	≥12.7±1.0 M_{🜨}	0.424±0.007	103.5±0.1	0.27±0.08	—	—
