= Fiber-optic Improved Next-generation Doppler Search for Exo-Earths =

Radial-velocity spectograph

The Fiber-Optic Improved Next-Generation Doppler Search for Exo-Earths (FINDS Exo-Earths) is a radial-velocity spectrograph developed by Debra Fischer. It is installed on the 3 meter telescope in Lick Observatory in Mount Hamilton. It has been in operation since 2009 and is being used to verify exoplanet candidates found by the Kepler space telescope.

At Yale University, Debra Fischer and Julien Spronck, along with Geoff Marcy of the University of California, Berkeley, set out to improve existing spectrograph technologies. Spurred by a $45,000 grant from The Planetary Society, the team built FINDS, a spectrograph add-on device.

== See also ==
- List of potentially habitable exoplanets

Similar instruments

- CORALIE spectrograph
- ELODIE spectrograph, the precursor instrument
- ESPRESSO, a new-generation spectrograph for ESO's VLT
- HARPS
- SOPHIE échelle spectrograph
