= HD 290327 =

Star in the constellation Orion

Observation data Epoch J2000.0 Equinox ICRS
- Constellation: Orion
- Right ascension: 05^{h} 23^{m} 21.5637^{s}
- Declination: −02° 16′ 39.433″
- Apparent magnitude (V): 8.99

Characteristics
- Evolutionary stage: main sequence
- Spectral type: G5IV or G8V
- Apparent magnitude (B): 9.751
- Apparent magnitude (J): 7.683±0.026
- Apparent magnitude (H): 7.404±0.047
- Apparent magnitude (K): 7.271±0.027
- B−V color index: 0.761±0.033

Astrometry
| Radial velocity (R_{v}) | +29.52±0.17 km/s |
| Proper motion (μ) | RA: 32.478(19) mas/yr Dec.: −97.255(13) mas/yr |
| Parallax (π) | 17.9008±0.0196 mas |
| Distance | 182.2 ± 0.2 ly (55.86 ± 0.06 pc) |
| Absolute magnitude (M_{V}) | 5.24 |

Details
| Mass | 0.86±0.01 M_{☉} |
| Radius | 0.95±0.02 R_{☉} |
| Luminosity | 0.747±0.004 L_{☉} |
| Surface gravity (log g) | 4.41±0.01 cgs |
| Temperature | 5,525±20 K |
| Metallicity [Fe/H] | −0.11 dex |
| Rotational velocity (v sin i) | 1.44±1.0 km/s |
| Age | 11.8±1.2 Gyr |

Other designations
- BD−02°128, HD 290327, HIP 25191, SAO 132049, PPM 175811

Database references
| SIMBAD | data |
| Exoplanet Archive | data |

HD 290327 is a single star in the equatorial constellation of Orion. It has a yellow hue with an apparent visual magnitude of 8.99, which is too faint to be viewed with the naked eye. Parallax measurements provide a distance estimate of 182 light-years from the Sun. It is drifting away with a radial velocity of +29.5 km/s, having come to within 124 light-years around a million years ago.

Kazanasmas (1973) found a stellar classification of G5IV for this object, matching a G-type star that is evolving along the subgiant branch. It was later given a class of G8V, suggesting it is instead a G-type main-sequence star. This object is nearly twelve billion years old and is spinning slowly with a projected rotational velocity of 1.4 km/s. The star has 86% of the mass of the Sun and 95% of the Sun's radius. It is radiating 75% of the luminosity of the Sun from its photosphere at an effective temperature of 5,525 K. The metallicity is sub-solar, meaning it has a lower abundance of elements other than hydrogen and helium compared to the Sun.

In 2009, a gas giant planet was found in orbit around the star. It is orbiting at a distance of around 3.4 AU with a period of 6.7 years.

The HD 290327 planetary system
| Companion (in order from star) | Mass | Semimajor axis (AU) | Orbital period (days) | Eccentricity | Inclination (°) | Radius |
|---|---|---|---|---|---|---|
| b | ≥ 2.54+0.17 −0.14 M_{J} | 3.43+0.20 −0.12 | 2,443+205 −117 | 0.08+0.08 −0.03 | — | — |

== See also ==
- List of extrasolar planets
