= HD 23596 =

Star in the constellation Perseus

Observation data Epoch J2000.0 Equinox ICRS
- Constellation: Perseus
- Right ascension: 03^{h} 48^{m} 00.37471^{s}
- Declination: +40° 31′ 50.2940″
- Apparent magnitude (V): 7.25

Characteristics
- Evolutionary stage: Subgiant
- Spectral type: F8
- B−V color index: 0.634±0.009

Astrometry
Radial velocity (R_{v})	−10.18±0.13 km/s
Proper motion (μ)	RA: 52.742±0.039 mas/yr Dec.: 21.740±0.026 mas/yr
Parallax (π)	19.3247±0.0306 mas
Distance	168.8 ± 0.3 ly (51.75 ± 0.08 pc)
Absolute magnitude (M_{V})	3.74

Details
Mass	1.2±0.04 M_{☉}
Radius	1.53±0.04 R_{☉}
Luminosity	2.63±0.03 L_{☉}
Surface gravity (log g)	4.14±0.03 cgs
Temperature	5,953±48 K
Metallicity [Fe/H]	0.32±0.05 dex
Rotational velocity (v sin i)	3.59±0.59 km/s
Age	5.0±0.7 Gyr

Other designations
- BD+40º835, HD 23596, HIP 17747, SAO 39110, WDS J03480+4032A

Database references
SIMBAD	data

HD 23596 is a star with an orbiting exoplanet companion in the constellation Perseus. It has an apparent visual magnitude of 7.25, which is too dim to be viewed with the naked eye. Based on parallax measurements, it is located at a distance of 169 light years from the Sun. The system is drifting closer with a radial velocity of −10 km/s.

The stellar classification of this star is F8, making it an F-type star with an undefined luminosity class. It is 20% more massive than the Sun and has 153% of the Sun's girth. The visual luminosity of the star is 2.63 times greater than the Sun, which it is radiating from its photosphere at an effective temperature of 5,953 K. It has an estimated age of five billion years, and is spinning with a projected rotational velocity of 3.6 km/s. The star is considered metal-rich, having a higher surface abundance of iron compared to the Sun.

== Planetary system ==
In June 2002, a massive long-period exoplanet orbiting the star was announced. In 2022, the inclination and true mass of HD 23596 b were measured via astrometry. It is orbiting at a distance of 2.7 AU from the host star with an orbital period of 4.2 years and an eccentricity (ovalness) of 0.28. This body has a mass around 12 times that of the planet Jupiter.

The HD 23596 planetary system
Companion (in order from star)	Mass	Semimajor axis (AU)	Orbital period (years)	Eccentricity	Inclination (°)	Radius
b	11.914+0.990 −1.768 M_{J}	2.694+0.107 −0.118	4.203+0.021 −0.025	0.282+0.017 −0.014	38.898+15.759 −77.179	—
