= HD 86264 =

Star in the constellation Hydra

Observation data Epoch J2000.0 Equinox ICRS
- Constellation: Hydra
- Right ascension: 09^{h} 56^{m} 57.83878^{s}
- Declination: −15° 53′ 42.4291″
- Apparent magnitude (V): 7.41

Characteristics
- Evolutionary stage: main sequence
- Spectral type: F7V
- Apparent magnitude (B): 7.920
- Apparent magnitude (J): 6.505±0.019
- Apparent magnitude (H): 6.344±0.038
- Apparent magnitude (K): 6.224±0.023
- B−V color index: 0.510±0.011

Astrometry
| Radial velocity (R_{v}) | 7.39±0.13 km/s |
| Proper motion (μ) | RA: −14.313±0.024 mas/yr Dec.: −65.057±0.024 mas/yr |
| Parallax (π) | 14.8646±0.0214 mas |
| Distance | 219.4 ± 0.3 ly (67.27 ± 0.10 pc) |
| Absolute magnitude (M_{V}) | 3.23 |

Details
| Mass | 1.46±0.01 M_{☉} 1.36+0.04 −0.05 M_{☉} 1.42 M_{☉} |
| Radius | 1.53±0.02 R_{☉} 1.88 R_{☉} |
| Luminosity | 4.02±0.04 L_{☉} |
| Surface gravity (log g) | 4.13±0.04 cgs |
| Temperature | 6,616±39 K |
| Metallicity [Fe/H] | 0.26±0.03 Dex +0.202 dex |
| Rotational velocity (v sin i) | 12.8±0.5 km/s |
| Age | 0.8±0.2 Gyr; 2.78+0.47 −0.70 Gyr; 2.24 Gyr |

Other designations
- BD−15°2938, HD 86264, HIP 48780, SAO 155612, PPM 222239

Database references
| SIMBAD | data |
| Exoplanet Archive | data |

HD 86264 is a single star with an exoplanetary companion in the equatorial constellation of Hydra. It is too faint to be readily visible to the naked eye with an apparent visual magnitude of 7.41. The distance to this star, as determined by parallax measurements, is 219 light-years, and it is drifting further away with a radial velocity of +7.4 km/s. A 2015 survey ruled out the existence of any stellar companions at projected distances above 30 astronomical units.

This is an F-type main-sequence star with a stellar classification of F7V. It is about two billion years old with a modest level of chromospheric activity and is spinning with a projected rotational velocity of 13 km/s. The star is larger and more massive compared to the Sun, and it has a higher metallicity—the abundance of elements with a higher atomic number than helium. It is radiating four times the luminosity of the Sun from its photosphere at an effective temperature of 6,616 K.

== Planetary system ==
In August 2009, it was announced that an exoplanet was found in an eccentric orbit around this host star. The extended habitable zone for this star ranges from 1.50 AU out to 5.06 AU. The planet orbits between 0.86 AU and 4.86 AU, crossing nearly all of the habitable zone. An estimate of the planet's inclination and true mass via astrometry, though with high error, was published in 2022.

The HD 86264 planetary system
| Companion (in order from star) | Mass | Semimajor axis (AU) | Orbital period (days) | Eccentricity | Inclination (°) | Radius |
|---|---|---|---|---|---|---|
| b | ≥7 ± 1.6 M_{J} | 2.86 ± 0.07 | 1,475 ± 55 | 0.7 ± 0.2 | — | — |

== See also ==
- Lists of planets
