= Lupus-TR-3 =

Distant star in the constellation Lupus

Observation data Epoch J2000 Equinox ICRS
- Constellation: Lupus
- Right ascension: 15^{h} 30^{m} 18.66718^{s}
- Declination: −42° 58′ 41.6640″
- Apparent magnitude (V): 17.4

Characteristics
- Spectral type: K1 V
- Apparent magnitude (B): 18.68±0.43
- Apparent magnitude (J): 15.80±0.09
- Apparent magnitude (H): 15.39±0.13
- Apparent magnitude (K): 15.48±0.25
- B−V color index: +1.28

Astrometry
Proper motion (μ)	RA: −3.798 mas/yr Dec.: −7.197 mas/yr
Distance	~2,000 pc

Details
Mass	0.87±0.04 M_{☉}
Radius	0.82±0.05 R_{☉}
Luminosity	0.38 L_{☉}
Surface gravity (log g)	4.5±0.5 cgs
Temperature	5,000±150 K

Other designations
- GSC2 S233113121866, USNO-B1.0 0470-00456338, DENIS-P J153018.6-425841, 2MASS J15301866-4258415

Database references
SIMBAD	data
Exoplanet Archive	data

Lupus-TR-3 is a star located in the southern constellation Lupus. It has an apparent magnitude of 17.4, making it visible only in powerful telescopes. Its distance is not well known, but it is estimated to be roughly 2,000 parsecs away from the Solar System.

== Physical characteristics ==
Lupus-TR-3 has a stellar classification of K1 V, indicating that it is an ordinary K-type main-sequence star. It has 87% the mass of the Sun and 82% the radius of the Sun. It radiates at an effective temperature of 5,000 K.

== Planetary system ==
Lupus-TR-3 b is an exoplanet discovered in 2007 by personnel from the Center for Astrophysics | Harvard & Smithsonian using the transit method. It has four-fifths the mass of Jupiter, nine-tenths the radius, and has density of 1.4 g/cm^{3}. This planet is a typical "hot Jupiter" as it orbits at 0.0464 AU distance from the star, taking 3.9 days to orbit. It is currently the faintest ground-based detection of a transiting planet.

The Lupus-TR-3 planetary system
Companion (in order from star)	Mass	Semimajor axis (AU)	Orbital period (days)	Eccentricity	Inclination (°)	Radius
b	0.81±0.18 M_{J}	0.0464 ± 0.0007	3.91405±0.00004	0.00	88.3^{+1.3}_{−0.8}	0.89±0.07 R_{J}

== See also ==
- List of extrasolar planets
- Harvard-Smithsonian Center for Astrophysics
