= Lupus-TR-3b =

Hot Jupiter

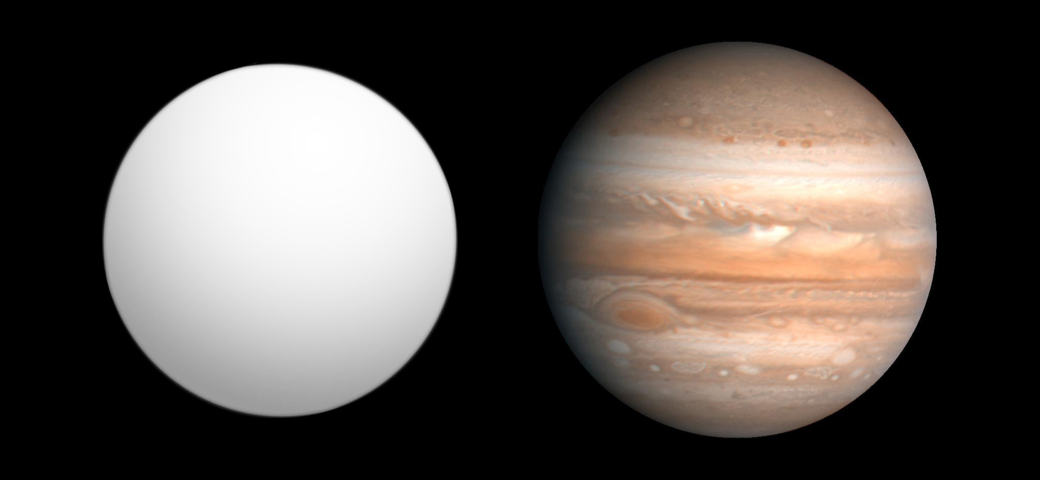
- Size comparison of Lupus-TR-3b with Jupiter.

Discovery
- Discovered by: Weldrake et al.
- Discovery site: Siding Spring Observatory
- Discovery date: November 12, 2007
- Detection method: Transit

Orbital characteristics
- Semi-major axis: 0.0464 ± 0.0007 AU (6,940,000 ± 100,000 km)
- Eccentricity: 0
- Orbital period (sidereal): 3.91405 ± 4e-5 d
- Inclination: 88.3^{+1.3}_{−0.8}
- Time of periastron: 2453887.0818
- Semi-amplitude: 114 ± 25
- Star: Lupus-TR-3

Physical characteristics
- Mean radius: 0.89 ± 0.07 R_{J}
- Mass: 0.81 ± 0.18 M_{J}
- Mean density: 1.40 ± 0.40 g/cm^{3}

Lupus-TR-3b is an extrasolar planet orbiting the star Lupus-TR-3 (a K-type main sequence star approximately 8,950 light-years away in the constellation Lupus). The planet was discovered in 2007 by personnel from the Center for Astrophysics | Harvard & Smithsonian observing at the Siding Spring Observatory in Australia, by the transit method.

The planet has four-fifths the mass of Jupiter, nine-tenths the radius, and has density of 1.4 g/cm^{3}. This planet is a typical “Hot Jupiter” as it orbits at 0.0464 AU distance from the star, taking 3.9 days to orbit. It is currently the faintest ground-based detection of a transiting planet.

== See also ==
- Harvard-Smithsonian Center for Astrophysics
