= HD 23596 b =

Exoplanet that orbits the star HD 23596 in the constellation of Perseus

Discovery
- Discovered by: Perrier et al.
- Discovery site: (France) Haute-Provence Observatory
- Discovery date: June 2002
- Detection method: radial velocity

Orbital characteristics
- Semi-major axis: 2.694+0.107 −0.118 AU
- Eccentricity: 0.282+0.017 −0.014
- Orbital period (sidereal): 4.203+0.021 −0.025 yr
- Inclination: 38.898°+15.759° −77.179°
- Longitude of ascending node: 16.684°+148.950° −21.642°
- Time of periastron: 2450036.142+18.541 −15.360
- Argument of periastron: 264.570°+3.372° −3.544°
- Semi-amplitude: 128.315+2.480 −2.670 m/s
- Star: HD 23596

Physical characteristics
- Mass: 11.914+0.990 −1.768 M_{J}

HD 23596 b is an exoplanet approximately 170 light years away in the constellation Perseus. The planet is very massive, with a minimum mass 7.8 times that of Jupiter, classifying it as mid-superjovian. Based on its mass, the planet would probably be a gas giant with no solid surface. The planet orbits at the average distance of 2.83 AU, taking 1565 days to complete its orbit with average velocity of 19.7 km/s. The eccentricity of the planet's orbit is higher than all the planets in the Solar System, bringing as close as 2.00 AU to as far as 3.66 AU from the parent star.

The planet was discovered by Perrier et al. in 2002 using the radial velocity technique to look for changes in inward (blue-shifting) and outward (red-shifting) radial stellar motion in the sky. In 2022, the inclination and true mass of HD 23596 b were measured via astrometry.
