= HD 104067 =

Star in the constellation Corvus

Observation data Epoch J2000.0 Equinox ICRS
- Constellation: Corvus
- Right ascension: 11^{h} 59^{m} 10.00884^{s}
- Declination: −20° 21′ 13.6121″
- Apparent magnitude (V): 7.92

Characteristics
- Evolutionary stage: main sequence
- Spectral type: K3V
- Apparent magnitude (B): 8.894
- Apparent magnitude (J): 6.212±0.019
- Apparent magnitude (H): 5.754±0.023
- Apparent magnitude (K): 5.614±0.024
- B−V color index: 0.974±0.010

Astrometry
Radial velocity (R_{v})	+14.89±0.12 km/s
Proper motion (μ)	RA: 141.706 mas/yr Dec.: −423.780 mas/yr
Parallax (π)	49.1470±0.0235 mas
Distance	66.36 ± 0.03 ly (20.347 ± 0.010 pc)
Absolute magnitude (M_{V})	+6.30

Details
Mass	0.818+0.024 −0.025 M_{☉}
Radius	0.771+0.007 −0.006 R_{☉}
Luminosity	0.307 L_{☉}
Surface gravity (log g)	4.56±0.10 cgs
Temperature	4,942±14 K
Metallicity [Fe/H]	0.11±0.06 dex
Rotation	18.3±4.9 d
Rotational velocity (v sin i)	2.47±0.96 km/s
Age	4.8+3.3 −3.0 Gyr

Other designations
- BD−19°3382, GJ 1153, HD 104067, HIP 58451, SAO 180353, PPM 259710, LTT 4461, NLTT 29176

Database references
SIMBAD	data
Exoplanet Archive	data
ARICNS	data

HD 104067 is a star with a planetary system in the southern constellation of Corvus. It has an apparent visual magnitude of 7.92 which is too faint to be visible with the naked eye. The distance to this star is 66.4 light-years (20.4 parsecs) based on parallax. It is drifting further away with a radial velocity of +15 km/s.

This is an ordinary K-type main-sequence star with a stellar classification of K3V. It is a moderately active star with an age of roughly five billion years. HD 104067 is spinning with a projected rotational velocity of 2.5 km/s, giving it a rotation period of approximately a month. The star has 82% of the mass and 77% of the radius of the Sun. It is radiating 31% of the Sun's luminosity from its photosphere at an effective temperature of 4,942 K. The metal content of this star is close to that in the Sun.

== Planetary system ==
HD 104067 has been observed as part of the HARPS planet-finding survey since 2004. The detection of an exoplanetary companion using the radial velocity method was announced in 2011. This sub-Saturn planet, HD 104067 b, has at least 0.2 times the mass of Jupiter and takes 55.8 days to orbit the star at a distance of 0.26 AU. The discovery of a second, Uranus-mass planet, HD 104067 c, was announced in 2024 based on HARPS and HIRES data. TESS observations also show evidence of a third candidate planet, slightly larger than Earth and orbiting closer to the star than the other two planets, with a period of just 2.2 days. Modeling suggests that this inner planet candidate may experience significant tidal heating.

The HD 104067 planetary system
Companion (in order from star)	Mass	Semimajor axis (AU)	Orbital period (days)	Eccentricity	Inclination (°)	Radius
TOI-6713.01 (unconfirmed)	—	0.03054(37)	2.1538197(41)	—	86.5±2.0°	1.30±0.12 R_{🜨}
c	≥13.2±1.9 M_{🜨}	0.1058±0.0013	13.8992+0.0047 −0.0037	0.29+0.12 −0.13	—	—
b	≥62.1+3.3 −3.2 M_{🜨}	0.2674+0.0032 −0.0033	55.851±0.017	0.123+0.048 −0.051	—	—

== See also ==
- List of extrasolar planets
