= High Accuracy Radial Velocity Planet Searcher =

Instrument for detecting planets

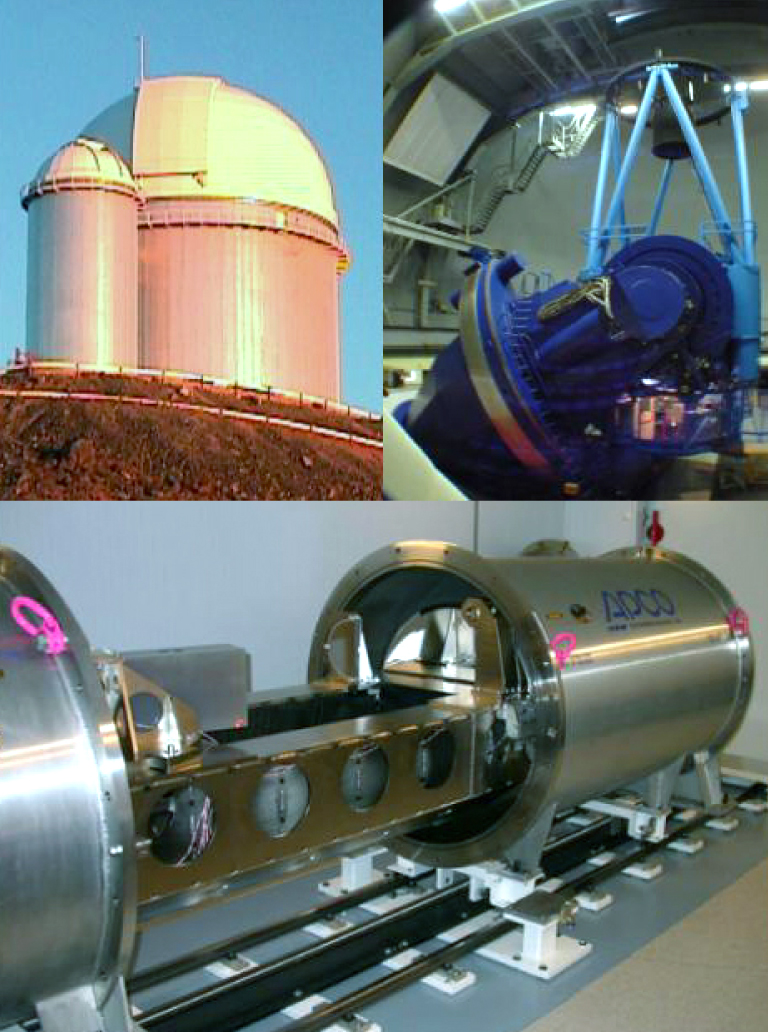
Montage of the HARPS spectrograph and the 3.6m telescope at La Silla. The upper left shows the dome of the telescope, while the upper right illustrates the telescope itself. The HARPS spectrograph is shown in the lower image during laboratory tests. The vacuum tank is open so that some of the high-precision components inside can be seen

The High Accuracy Radial Velocity Planet Searcher (HARPS) is a high-precision echelle planet-finding spectrograph installed in 2002 on the ESO's 3.6m telescope at La Silla Observatory in Chile. The first light was achieved in February 2003. HARPS has discovered over 130 exoplanets to date, with the first one in 2004. It is a second-generation radial-velocity spectrograph, based on experience with the ELODIE and CORALIE instruments.

== Characteristics ==
The HARPS can attain a precision of 0.97 m/s (3.5 km/h), making it one of only two instruments worldwide with such accuracy. This is due to a design in which the target star and a reference spectrum from a thorium lamp are observed simultaneously using two identical optic fibre feeds, and to careful attention to mechanical stability: the instrument sits in a vacuum vessel which is temperature-controlled to within 0.01 kelvin. The precision and sensitivity of the instrument is such that it incidentally produced the best available measurement of the thorium spectrum. Planet-detection is in some cases limited by the seismic pulsations of the star observed rather than by limitations of the instrument.

The principal investigator on the HARPS is Michel Mayor who, along with Didier Queloz and Stéphane Udry, have used the instrument to characterize the Gliese 581 planetary system, home to three confirmed exoplanets.

It was initially used for a survey of one-thousand stars.

Since October 2012 the HARPS spectrograph has the precision to detect a new category of planets: habitable super-Earths. This sensitivity was expected from simulations of stellar intrinsic signals, and actual observations of planetary systems. Currently, the HARPS can detect habitable super-Earth only around low-mass stars as these are more affected by gravitational tug from planets and have habitable zones close to the host star.

== Discoveries ==
This is an incomplete list of exoplanets discovered by the HARPS. The list is sorted by the date of the discovery's announcement. As of 2026, the list contains 134 exoplanets.

HD 330075 b	10 February 2004
Dulcinea	25 August 2004
HD 2638 b	22 March 2005
HD 27894 b	22 March 2005
Ibirapitá	22 March 2005
Melquíades	30 March 2005
HD 101930 b	30 March 2005
Gliese 581 b	8 September 2005
HD 4308 b	12 October 2005
HD 212301 b	25 January 2006
HD 69830 b	18 May 2006
HD 69830 c	18 May 2006
HD 69830 d	18 May 2006
Rocinante	14/18 August 2006
Gliese 674 b	2 April 2007
Laligurans	6 April 2007
HD 190647 b	6 April 2007
Pipitea	6 April 2007
Gliese 581 c	23 April 2007
Gliese 581 d	23 April 2007
HD 171028 b	7 August 2007
HD 40307 b	27 June 2008
HD 40307 c	27 June 2008
HD 40307 d	27 June 2008
Gliese 176 b (Note: has a shorter period.)	4 September 2008
Finlay	26 October 2008
Baiduri	26 October 2008
HD 73267 b	26 October 2008
HD 131664 b (Note: This is an M sin i brown dwarf.)	26 October 2008
HD 145377 b	26 October 2008
Trimobe	26 October 2008
HD 47186 b	9 December 2008
HD 47186 c	9 December 2008
HD 181433 b	9 December 2009
HD 181433 c	9 December 2009
HD 181433 d	9 December 2009
HD 45364 b	3 February 2009
HD 45364 c	3 February 2009
Gliese 581 e	21 April 2009
Gliese 667 Cb	19 October 2009
BD-08°2823 b	16 December 2009
BD-08°2823 c	16 December 2009
HD 5388 b (Note: This is a brown dwarf.)	16 December 2009
HD 181720 b	16 December 2009
HD 190984 b	16 December 2009

HD 125612 c	29 December 2009
HD 125612 d	29 December 2009
HD 215497 b	29 December 2009
HD 215497 c	29 December 2009
HIP 5158 b	29 December 2009
Madalitso	5 October 2010
HD 90156 b	5 October 2010
HD 103197 b	5 October 2010
Koeia	6 December 2010
HD 1690 b	17 December 2010
HD 25171 b	17 December 2010
HD 113538 b	17 December 2010
HD 113538 c	17 December 2010
HD 217786 b	17 December 2010
HD 33473 Ab	17 December 2010
HD 89839 b	17 December 2010
HD 167677 b	17 December 2010
HD 10180 b	23 November 2010
HD 10180 c	23 November 2010
HD 10180 d	23 November 2010
HD 10180 e	23 November 2010
HD 10180 f	23 November 2010
HD 10180 g	23 November 2010
HD 10180 h	23 November 2010
Tapecue	1 July 2011
HD 104067 b	1 July 2011
HD 125595 b	1 July 2011
HIP 70849 b	1 July 2011
Kererū	8 July 2011
HD 204941 b	8 July 2011
Emiw	8 July 2011
HD 7449 b	8 July 2011
82 G. Eridani b	17 August 2011
82 G. Eridani c	17 August 2011
82 G. Eridani d	17 August 2011
HD 85512 b	17 August 2011
HR 7722 c	17 August 2011
HD 1461 c	12 September 2011
HD 13808 b	12 September 2011
HD 13808 c	12 September 2011
HD 20003 b	12 September 2011
HD 20003 c	12 September 2011
HD 20781 b	12 September 2011
HD 20781 c	12 September 2011
HD 21693 b	12 September 2011

HD 21693 c	12 September 2011
HD 31527 b	12 September 2011
HD 31527 c	12 September 2011
HD 31527 d	12 September 2011
HD 38858 b	12 September 2011
HD 39194 b	12 September 2011
HD 39194 c	12 September 2011
HD 39194 d	12 September 2011
HD 45184 b	12 September 2011
HD 51608 b	12 September 2011
HD 51608 c	12 September 2011
HD 93385 b	12 September 2011
HD 93385 c	12 September 2011
HD 96700 b	12 September 2011
HD 96700 c	12 September 2011
HD 126525 b	12 September 2011
HD 134060 b	12 September 2011
HD 134060 c	12 September 2011
HD 134606 b	12 September 2011
HD 134606 c	12 September 2011
HD 134606 d	12 September 2011
ν^{2} Lupi b	12 September 2011
ν^{2} Lupi c	12 September 2011
ν^{2} Lupi d	12 September 2011
HD 150433 b	12 September 2011
HD 154088 b	12 September 2011
HD 157172 b	12 September 2011
HD 189567 b	12 September 2011
HD 204313 c	12 September 2011
HD 215152 b	12 September 2011
HD 215152 c	12 September 2011
HD 215456 b	12 September 2011
HD 215456 c	12 September 2011
Gliese 667 Cc	21 November 2011
HD 10180 i	5 April 2012
HD 10180 j	5 April 2012
Phailinsiam	22 June 2012
Gliese 676 c	29 June 2012
Gliese 676 d	29 June 2012
Gliese 676 e	29 June 2012
Gliese 163 b	6 September 2012
Gliese 163 c	6 September 2012
Gliese 667 Cd	25 June 2013
Gliese 667 Cg	25 June 2013

== Gallery ==
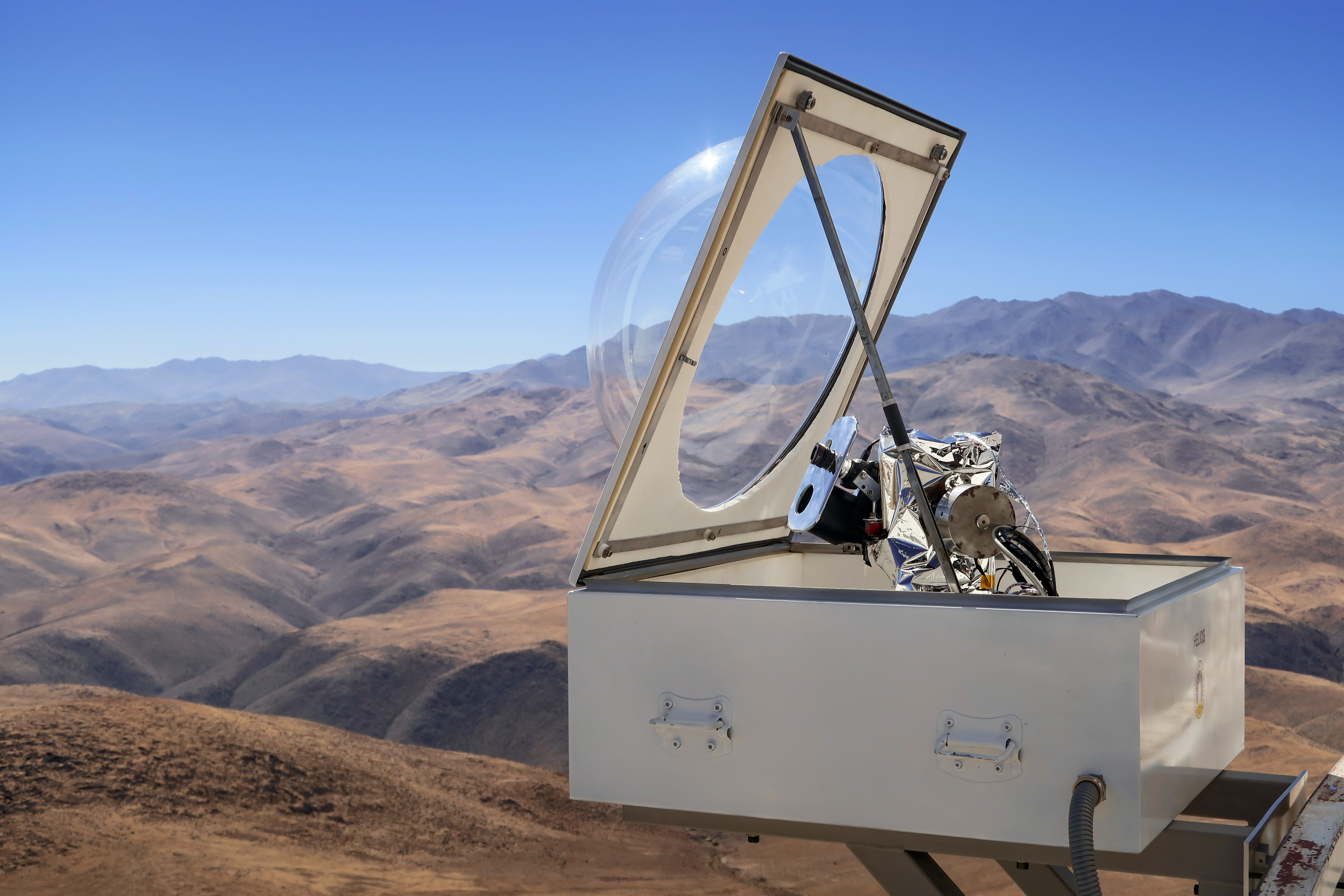
HELIOS instrument installed to feed sunlight via fibre optics to the HARPS

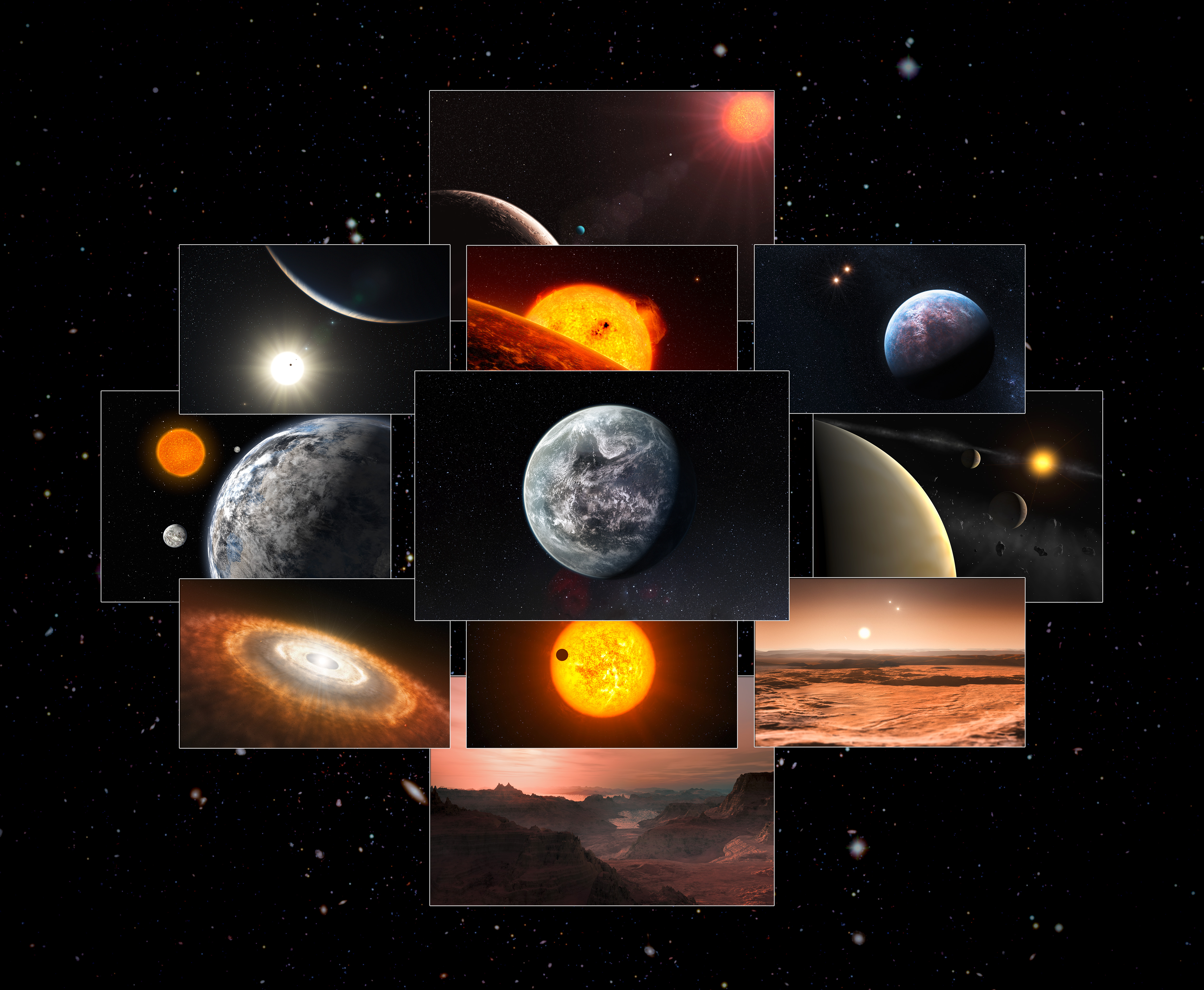
A decade of discoveries from HARPS

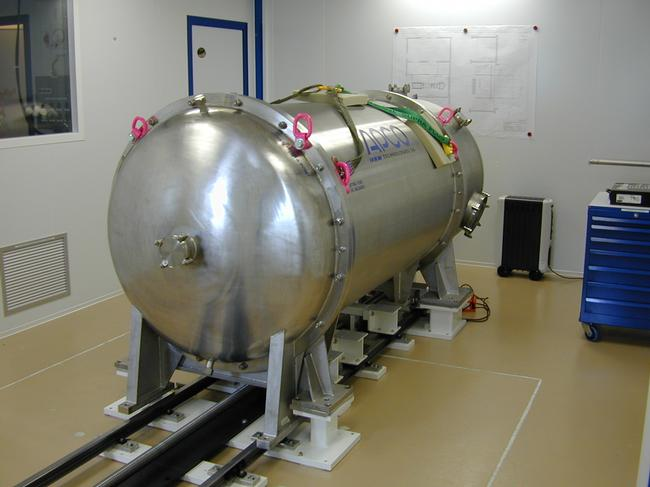
HARPS spectrograph

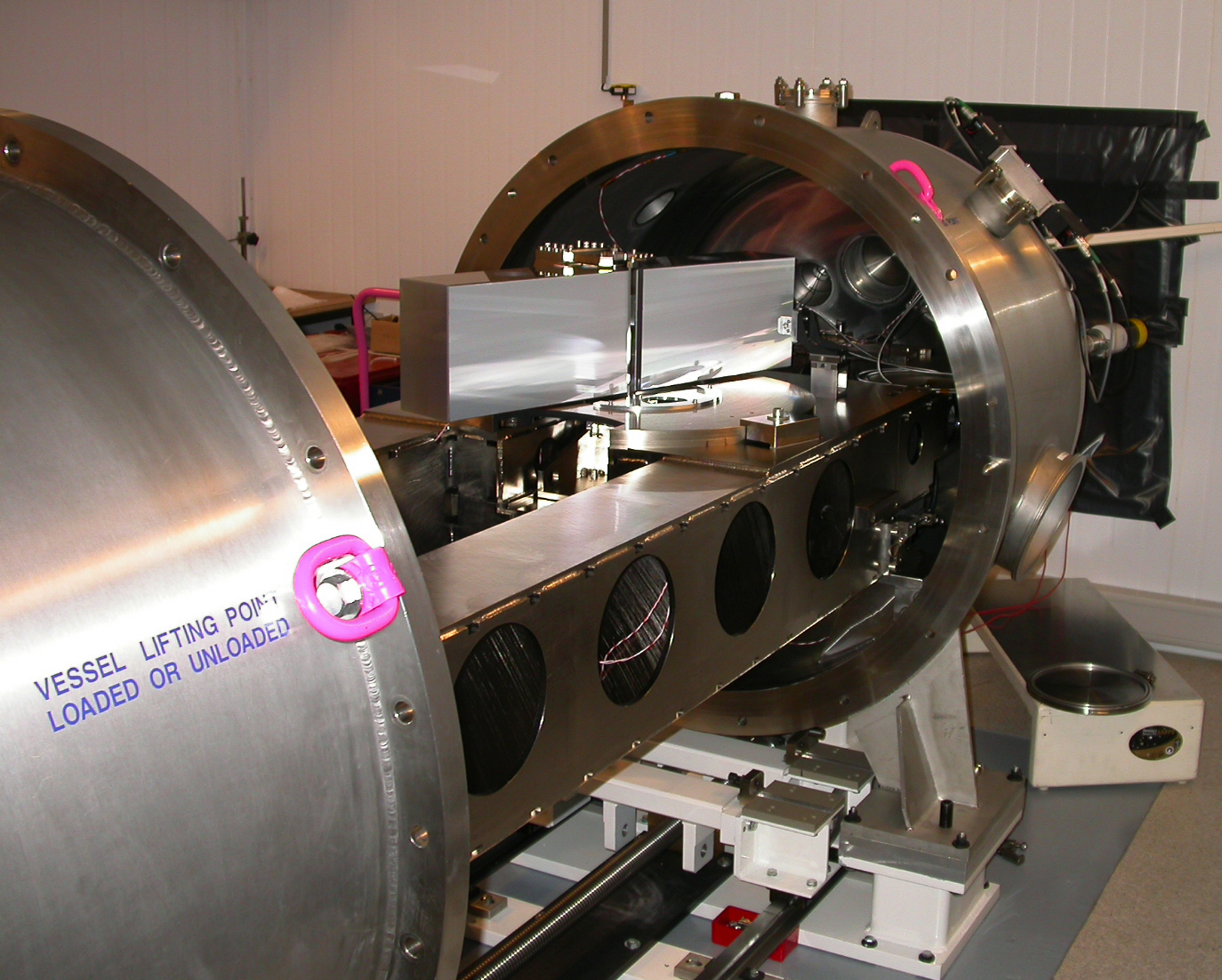
HARPS spectrograph detail

Animation of HD 10180 with its seven planets

== See also ==
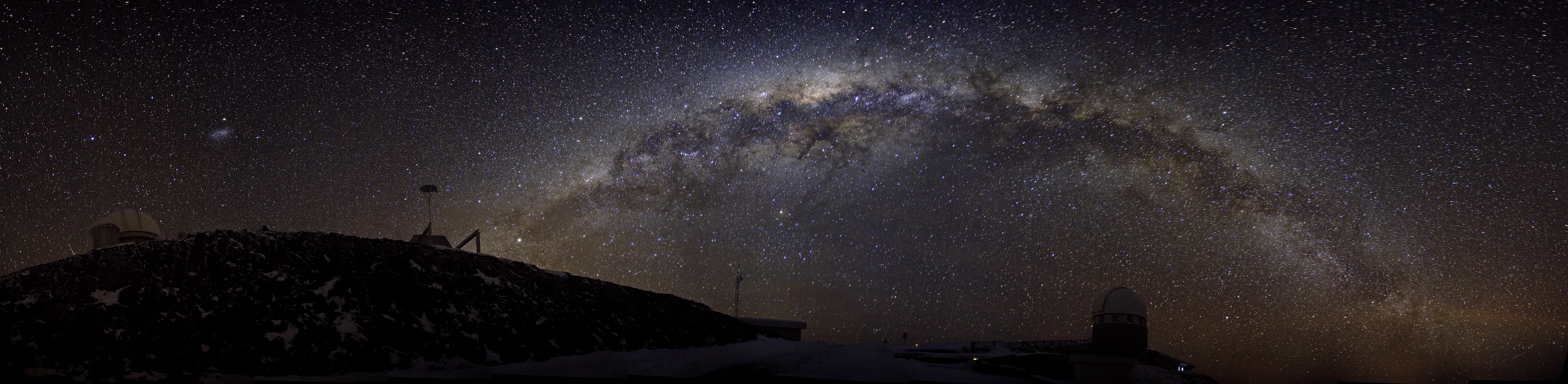
ESO 3.6-metre telescope is home to the world's foremost exoplanet hunter, HARPS.

Similar instruments:

- HARPS-N is a copy of this instrument installed in the northern hemisphere in 2012.
- HARPS3 is an updated design of this instrument that will be installed on an upgraded and roboticised Isaac Newton Telescope, in 2024.
- Fiber-optic Improved Next-generation Doppler Search for Exo-Earths, operating at Lick observatory since 2009
- Anglo-Australian Planet Search or AAPS is another southern hemisphere planet search program.
- ESPRESSO is a new-generation spectrograph for ESO's VLT.
- Automated Planet Finder, at the Lick observatory, commissioned in 2013.
- CAFE (Calar Alto Fibre-fed Echelle spectrograph) installed on the Calar Alto Observatory's 2.2-metre telescope in 2014, and the CARMENES mounted on the 3.5-metre telescope in 2016.
- EXPRES is a third generation radial velocity spectrograph that is planned to be installed on the Lowell Discovery Telescope.

Space based detectors :

- CoRoT, spacecraft operating since 2007
- Kepler space telescope, operational until 2018
- Terrestrial Planet Finder, cancelled
- Space Interferometry Mission, construction halted in 2010
- Darwin, early studies for a multi-satellite mission
