= HD 86264 b =

Exoplanet

Discovery
- Discovery date: August 13, 2009
- Detection method: Radial velocity

Orbital characteristics
- Apastron: 4.86 AU (727,000,000 km)
- Periastron: 0.86 AU (129,000,000 km)
- Semi-major axis: 2.86 ± 0.07 AU (428,000,000 ± 10,000,000 km)
- Eccentricity: 0.7 ± 0.2
- Orbital period (sidereal): 1475 ± 55 d 4.04 ± 0.15 y
- Time of periastron: 15172 ± 114
- Argument of periastron: 306 ± 10
- Star: HD 86264

HD 86264 b is an extrasolar planet which orbits the F-type main sequence star HD 86264, located approximately 237 light years away in the constellation Hydra. The planet is considered to orbit in an eccentric path around the star with a period of about four years. This planet can be as close as 0.86 AU to as far as 4.86 AU. It has minimum mass seven Jupiter masses and orbits at a distance of 2.86 astronomical units. This planet was detected by radial velocity method on August 13, 2009.

An estimate of the planet's inclination and true mass (~9.81 M_{J}) via astrometry, though with high error, was published in 2022.
