= HIP 5158 =

Star in the constellation Cetus

Observation data Epoch J2000.0 Equinox ICRS
- Constellation: Cetus
- Right ascension: 01^{h} 06^{m} 02.050^{s}
- Declination: −22° 27′ 11.35″
- Apparent magnitude (V): 10.16

Characteristics
- Spectral type: K5V
- Apparent magnitude (B): 11.238
- B−V color index: 1.078±0.001

Astrometry
Radial velocity (R_{v})	+15.28±0.23 km/s
Proper motion (μ)	RA: +203.818 mas/yr Dec.: −106.926 mas/yr
Parallax (π)	19.3199±0.0198 mas
Distance	168.8 ± 0.2 ly (51.76 ± 0.05 pc)
Absolute magnitude (M_{V})	7.11

Details
Mass	0.75±0.01 M_{☉}
Radius	0.69±0.02 R_{☉}
Luminosity	0.19±0.01 L_{☉}
Surface gravity (log g)	4.63±0.02 cgs
Temperature	4,571±14 K
Metallicity [Fe/H]	0.10±0.07 dex
Rotation	42.3 days
Age	4.5±3.2 Gyr

Other designations
- CD−23°395, HIP 5158, SAO 166798, PPM 243575, LTT 617, NLTT 3632, 2MASS J01060202-2227111

Database references
SIMBAD	data
Exoplanet Archive	data

HIP 5158 is a star with a pair of orbiting substellar companions, located in the equatorial constellation of Cetus, the whale. It has the older designation CD-23 395, which is derived from the Cordoba Durchmusterung catalogue of southern stars. Based on parallax measurements, it is located 169 light years from the Sun. It has an absolute magnitude of 7.11, but at that distance the star has an apparent visual magnitude of 10.16, which is too dim to be visible to the naked eye. The system is receding with a radial velocity of 15.3 km/s, and it has a relatively high proper motion, traversing the celestial sphere at an angular rate of 0.205″·yr^{−1}.

The spectrum of HIP 5158 matches an ordinary K-type main-sequence star, an orange dwarf, with a stellar classification of K5V. The age of this star is poorly constrained, but it appears to be comparable to the Sun. It is spinning slowly with a rotation period of around 42.3 days. Based on the abundance of iron, this star appears metal rich, having concentration of heavy elements equal to 125% of solar abundance. It has 75% of the mass of the Sun and 60% of the Sun's radius. The star is radiating just 19% of the luminosity of the Sun from its photosphere at an effective temperature of 4,571 K.

== Planetary system ==
In 2009, a gas giant planet, HIP 5158 b, was found in orbit around the star. This planet was detected by HARPS in October 2009. The quadratic drift in the radial velocities indicated the presence of an additional outer planet in the system, which was confirmed in 2011. The large uncertainty in the mass of HIP 5158 c leaves in question whether this is an exoplanet or a brown dwarf.

The HIP 5158 planetary system
Companion (in order from star)	Mass	Semimajor axis (AU)	Orbital period (days)	Eccentricity	Inclination (°)	Radius
b	≥1.44±0.14 M_{J}	0.89±0.01	345.63±1.99	0.54±0.04	—	—
c	≥15.04±10.55 M_{J}	7.70±1.88	9,018±3,181	0.14±0.10	—	—

== See also ==
- List of extrasolar planets
