= HD 38858 =

Star in the constellation Orion

- Location of HD 38858 (circled in red)

Observation data Epoch J2000.0 Equinox ICRS
- Constellation: Orion
- Right ascension: 05^{h} 48^{m} 34.94026^{s}
- Declination: −04° 05′ 40.7218″
- Apparent magnitude (V): +5.97

Characteristics
- Evolutionary stage: main sequence
- Spectral type: G4V
- U−B color index: +0.10
- B−V color index: +0.64

Astrometry
Radial velocity (R_{v})	+31.2 km/s
Proper motion (μ)	RA: +61.427 mas/yr Dec.: −229.291 mas/yr
Parallax (π)	65.7446±0.0307 mas
Distance	49.61 ± 0.02 ly (15.210 ± 0.007 pc)
Absolute magnitude (M_{V})	+5.06

Details
Mass	0.886 M_{☉}
Radius	0.9331±0.0162 R_{☉}
Luminosity	0.7943±0.0101 L_{☉}
Surface gravity (log g)	4.36±0.06 cgs
Temperature	5,660±20 K
Metallicity [Fe/H]	−0.27±0.03 dex
Rotational velocity (v sin i)	2.61 km/s
Age	6.2 Gyr

Other designations
- BD−04°1244, FK5 1155, GJ 1085, HD 38858, HIP 27435, LTT 2380, SAO 132554

Database references
SIMBAD	data
Exoplanet Archive	data

HD 38858 is a star in the constellation Orion. It is a G-type main-sequence star, located at a distance of about 50 light-years. It has an apparent magnitude of 5.97, so it can be seen by the naked eye only in sufficiently dark skies.

This system was observed for a dust disc or comet belt in 2009 by the Spitzer Space Telescope; a belt was inferred at 102 AU. It has an inclination of 48°.

The star exhibits a magnetic activity cycle remarkably similar to that of the Sun, with a period of 10.8 years.

== Planetary system ==
Debris disk with the REASONS survey

The exoplanet HD 38858 b was discovered in 2011 in orbit in its host star's habitable zone, a zone in which Earth-like conditions (namely the presence of liquid water) on a planet's surface are possible. The planet is likely a gas giant, a type of planet which astronomers believe is unlikely to support life as it is currently understood. However, the planet could have a rocky natural satellite capable of sustaining an Earth-like environment.

The existence of this planet was disputed since 2015 though, attributing the planetary signal to the frequency-domain alias of the star magnetic activity cycle, although the existence of another planet on the 198-day orbit is suspected.

The HD 38858 planetary system
Companion (in order from star)	Mass	Semimajor axis (AU)	Orbital period (days)	Eccentricity	Inclination (°)	Radius
b (disputed)	32 M_{🜨}	1.0376±0.0189	407.15±4.2857	0.27±0.17	—	—
Disk	102 AU				—	—
