= HD 125595 =

Star in the constellation Centaurus

Observation data Epoch J2000.0 Equinox ICRS
- Constellation: Centaurus
- Right ascension: 14^{h} 21^{m} 23.186^{s}
- Declination: −40° 23′ 38.22″
- Apparent magnitude (V): 9.03

Characteristics
- Evolutionary stage: Main sequence
- Spectral type: K4V(k)
- Apparent magnitude (B): 10.137
- Apparent magnitude (J): 7.097±0.021
- Apparent magnitude (H): 6.608±0.026
- Apparent magnitude (K): 6.447±0.023
- B−V color index: 1.107±0.006

Astrometry
Radial velocity (R_{v})	+4.48±0.45 km/s
Proper motion (μ)	RA: −561.636 mas/yr Dec.: −68.516 mas/yr
Parallax (π)	35.4337±0.0762 mas
Distance	92.0 ± 0.2 ly (28.22 ± 0.06 pc)
Absolute magnitude (M_{V})	6.80

Details
Mass	0.77 M_{☉}
Radius	0.73+0.02 −0.03 R_{☉}
Luminosity	0.241 L_{☉}
Surface gravity (log g)	4.58 cgs
Temperature	4,672 K
Metallicity [Fe/H]	0.13 dex
Rotation	37.2±2.0 d
Rotational velocity (v sin i)	1.50 km/s
Age	8.17 Gyr

Other designations
- CD−39°8857, GJ 545.1, HD 125595, HIP 70170, PPM 319432, LHS 2900, LPM 523, LTT 5648, NLTT 37029, GCRV 64739

Database references
SIMBAD	data
Exoplanet Archive	data

HD 125595 is a star with a close Neptunian companion in the southern constellation of Centaurus. With an apparent visual magnitude of 9.03, this star is too faint to be viewed with the naked eye. It is located at a distance of 92 light years from the Sun based on parallax measurements, and is drifting further away with a radial velocity of +4.5 km/s. The star has a high proper motion, traversing the celestial sphere and an angular rate of 0.57 arcsecond yr^{−1}.

This is an ordinary K-type main-sequence star with a stellar classification of K4V(k), which indicates it is a small star that is generating energy at its core through hydrogen fusion. It is about eight billion years old and is spinning with a projected rotational velocity of 1.5 km/s, giving it a 37 day rotation period. The star shows a moderate level of chromospherically activity due to star spots or plagues. It is smaller, cooler, dimmer, and less massive than the Sun, but shows a higher atmospheric metallicity.

== Planetary system ==
In 2018 an exoplanet companion was announced by the HARPS program, using the radial velocity method. It is a Neptune-mass object orbiting 0.081 AU (12.1 Gm) from the host star with a period of 9.7 days.

The HD 125595 planetary system
Companion (in order from star)	Mass	Semimajor axis (AU)	Orbital period (days)	Eccentricity	Inclination (°)	Radius
b	≥ 0.042±0.004 M_{J}	0.0809±0.0014	9.6737±0.0039	0.0	—	—

== See also ==
- List of extrasolar planets
