= HD 45364 =

G-type star in the constellation Canis Major

Observation data Epoch J2000.0 Equinox ICRS
- Constellation: Canis Major
- Right ascension: 06^{h} 25^{m} 38.47436^{s}
- Declination: −31° 28′ 51.4307″
- Apparent magnitude (V): 8.08

Characteristics
- Evolutionary stage: main sequence
- Spectral type: G8V
- B−V color index: 0.719±0.015
- V−R color index: 0.01

Astrometry
Radial velocity (R_{v})	+16.40±0.14 km/s
Proper motion (μ)	RA: +52.242 mas/yr Dec.: −11.771 mas/yr
Parallax (π)	29.1339±0.0172 mas
Distance	111.95 ± 0.07 ly (34.32 ± 0.02 pc)
Absolute magnitude (M_{V})	+5.51

Details
Mass	0.88±0.02 M_{☉}
Radius	0.82±0.01 R_{☉}
Luminosity	0.562±0.004 L_{☉}
Surface gravity (log g)	4.55±0.03 cgs
Temperature	5,540±31 K
Metallicity [Fe/H]	−0.14±0.03 dex
Rotational velocity (v sin i)	1.672±0.665 km/s
Age	3.4±2.7 Gyr

Other designations
- CD−31°3286, HD 30579, HIP 30579, SAO 196806

Database references
SIMBAD	data
Exoplanet Archive	data

HD 45364 is a star in the southern constellation of Canis Major. It is too faint to be visible to the naked eye, having an apparent visual magnitude of 8.08. The distance to this system is 112 light-years based on parallax. It is drifting further away from the Sun with a radial velocity of +16.4 km/s, having come within 49 light-years some 1.5 million years ago.

This object is an ordinary G-type main-sequence star with a stellar classification of G8V, which indicates it is generating energy through core hydrogen fusion. It is around 3.4 billion years old and is spinning with a projected rotational velocity of 1.7 km/s. The star has 88% of the mass of the Sun and 82% of the Sun's radius. It is radiating 56% of the luminosity of the Sun from its photosphere at an effective temperature of 5,540 K. As of August 2008 there are two confirmed extrasolar planets (or exoplanets) orbiting around it.

== Planetary system ==
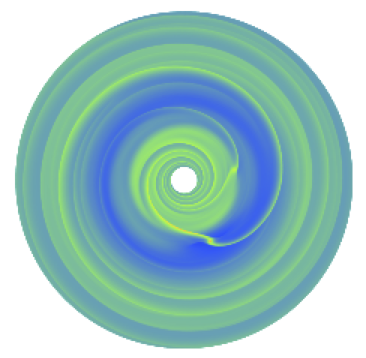
Hydrodynamic formation scenario of HD 45364

HD 45364 was one of the earlier systems discovered to have more than one exoplanet in orbit. The two planets, HD 45364 b and HD 45364 c, respectively, were both discovered in August 2008 using the radial velocity method. The pair was initially believed to be orbiting the host star with a 3:2 mean motion resonance, which means the inner planet is completing three orbits for every two orbits of the outer planet.

It was difficult to explain how such resonant configuration of planetary orbits could evolve, mainly due to the planets orbital eccentricities being about four to five times too high, although planetary system formation models involving hydrodynamic effects have been proposed.

As in 2022, refined radial-velocity data shows the planetary orbits are more circular and widely spaced, therefore planets are slightly out of mean motion resonance state.

The HD 45364 planetary system
Companion (in order from star)	Mass	Semimajor axis (AU)	Orbital period (days)	Eccentricity	Inclination (°)	Radius
b	≥0.1893^{+0.0062}_{−0.006} M_{J}	0.6793^{+0.0016}_{−0.0015}	225.79^{+0.81}_{−0.76}	0.067±0.016	—	—
c	≥0.5490^{+0.0075}_{−0.0074} M_{J}	0.9020±0.0010	345.43^{+0.54}_{−0.57}	0.019^{+0.011}_{−0.010}	—	—
