= HD 90156 =

Star in the constellation Hydra

Observation data Epoch J2000.0 Equinox ICRS
- Constellation: Hydra
- Right ascension: 10^{h} 23^{m} 55.274^{s}
- Declination: −29° 38′ 43.91″
- Apparent magnitude (V): 6.92

Characteristics
- Evolutionary stage: main sequence
- Spectral type: G5 V
- Apparent magnitude (B): 7.579
- Apparent magnitude (J): 5.685±0.023
- Apparent magnitude (H): 5.382±0.034
- Apparent magnitude (K): 5.245±0.024
- B−V color index: 0.659±0.007
- Variable type: None

Astrometry
Radial velocity (R_{v})	+26.958±0.0002 km/s
Proper motion (μ)	RA: −39.159 mas/yr Dec.: +99.302 mas/yr
Parallax (π)	45.5628±0.0214 mas
Distance	71.58 ± 0.03 ly (21.95 ± 0.01 pc)
Absolute magnitude (M_{V})	5.17

Details
Mass	0.837±0.009 M_{☉}
Radius	0.876±0.013 R_{☉}
Luminosity	0.74±0.01 L_{☉}
Surface gravity (log g)	4.40±0.02 cgs
Temperature	5,599±12 K
Metallicity [Fe/H]	−0.24±0.01 dex
Rotational velocity (v sin i)	0.817 km/s
Age	4.4 Gyr; 8.1±3.8 Gyr

Other designations
- Gamma Antliae, CD−29°8316, GJ 3597, HD 90156, HIP 50921, SAO 178771, PPM 257610

Database references
SIMBAD	data
Exoplanet Archive	data

HD 90156 is a star with an orbiting exoplanet in the constellation Hydra. Based on parallax measurements, it is located at a distance of 71.6 light-years from the Sun. The system is drifting further away with a heliocentric radial velocity of 27 km/s. The apparent visual magnitude of this star is 6.92, which is places it near the lower limit of visibility to the naked eye. A survey in 2015 ruled out the existence of any stellar companions at projected distances above 5 AU.

This star was designated as Gamma Antliae by Lacaille, and Gould intended to keep it in Antlia. However, the delineating of constellation boundaries in 1930 saw it transferred to Hydra.

The spectrum of HD 90156 presents as a G-type main-sequence star with a stellar classification of G5 V It is rotating slowly with a projected rotational velocity of 0.817, and it only displays a low level of magnetic activity in its chromosphere. The metallicity of the star is lower than in the Sun, indicating a paucity of elements with mass greater than helium. The star has 84% of the mass of the Sun and 88% of the Sun's radius. It is radiating 74% of the Sun's luminosity from its photosphere at an effective temperature of 5,599 K.

== Planetary system ==
In 2011, an exoplanet was found in an eccentric orbit around the host star using Doppler spectroscopy. As the inclination of its orbital plane is unknown, only a lower bound on its mass can be determined. It has at least 18 times the mass of the Earth. The exoplanet is orbiting its host star with a separation of 0.25 AU and a period of 50 days.

The HD 90156 planetary system
Companion (in order from star)	Mass	Semimajor axis (AU)	Orbital period (days)	Eccentricity	Inclination (°)	Radius
b	≥17.98 ± 1.46 M_{🜨}	0.250 ± 0.004	49.77 ± 0.07	0.31 ± 0.10	—	—

== See also ==
- List of extrasolar planets
