= HD 20868 b =

Extrasolar planet in the constellation Fornax

HD 20868 b / Baiduri
Discovery
- Discovered by: Moutou et al.
- Discovery site: La Silla Observatory
- Discovery date: October 26, 2008
- Detection method: Doppler spectroscopy (HARPS)

Orbital characteristics
- Semi-major axis: 0.947 ± 0.012 AU (141,700,000 ± 1,800,000 km)
- Eccentricity: 0.75 ± 0.002
- Orbital period (sidereal): 380.85 ± 0.09 d 1.0427 ± 0.0002 y
- Average orbital speed: 27.1
- Time of periastron: 2,454,451.52 ± 0.1
- Argument of periastron: 356.2 ± 0.4
- Star: HD 20868

HD 20868 b is an extrasolar planet located approximately 156 light-years away in the constellation of Fornax, orbiting the 10th magnitude K-type subgiant star HD 20868. This planet has a minimum mass of 1.99 times more than Jupiter and orbits at a distance of 0.947 AU. This planet takes 380.85 days or 12.5 months to revolve around the star with an eccentricity of 0.75, one of the most eccentric of any known extrasolar planets. At periastron, the distance is 0.237 AU and at apastron, the distance is 1.66 AU.

The planet HD 20868 b is named Baiduri. The name was selected in the NameExoWorlds campaign by Malaysia, during the 100th anniversary of the IAU. Baiduri means opal in Malay language.

This planet was discovered on October 26, 2008 by Moutou et al. using the HARPS spectrograph on ESO’s 3.6 meter telescope installed at La Silla Observatory in Atacama Desert, Chile.
