= HD 131664 =

Star in the constellation Apus

Observation data Epoch J2000 Equinox ICRS
- Constellation: Apus
- Right ascension: 15^{h} 00^{m} 06.08006^{s}
- Declination: −73° 32′ 07.1895″
- Apparent magnitude (V): 8.13

Characteristics
- Evolutionary stage: main sequence
- Spectral type: G3 V
- B−V color index: 0.667

Astrometry
Radial velocity (R_{v})	+35.36±0.13 km/s
Proper motion (μ)	RA: +8.008 mas/yr Dec.: +22.284 mas/yr
Parallax (π)	18.1360±0.0829 mas
Distance	179.8 ± 0.8 ly (55.1 ± 0.3 pc)
Absolute magnitude (M_{V})	4.41

Orbit
Name	HD 131664 b
Period (P)	5.424±0.004 yr
Semi-major axis (a)	3.2±0.1 AU
Eccentricity (e)	0.693±0.002
Inclination (i)	170.7±1.5°
Longitude of the node (Ω)	348.3±6.4°
Periastron epoch (T)	2452023±2
Argument of periastron (ω) (primary)	151.8±0.3°
Semi-amplitude (K_{1}) (primary)	0.4337±0.0031 km/s

Details

HD 131664 A
Mass	1.10 M_{☉}
Radius	1.16 R_{☉}
Luminosity	1.60 L_{☉}
Surface gravity (log g)	4.50 cgs
Temperature	5,901 K
Metallicity [Fe/H]	0.281 dex
Rotation	25 days
Rotational velocity (v sin i)	3.01 km/s
Age	2.32 Gyr

HD 131664 b
Mass	127.8±17.9 M_{Jup}

Other designations
- CD−73°1031, HD 131664, HIP 73408

Database references
SIMBAD	data
Exoplanet Archive	data

HD 131664 is an 8th magnitude star in the southern constellation of Apus with an orbiting brown dwarf or stellar companion. Parallax measurements by the Gaia space observatory provide an estimated distance of 172.5 light years from the Earth. The system is moving further away with a baseline heliocentric radial velocity of +35 km/s.

The primary component is an ordinary G-type main-sequence star with a stellar classification of G3 V. The star is particularly metal-rich ([Fe/H] = 0.28) in comparison with the mean metallicity of the solar neighborhood. It is about 2.3 billion years old with a projected rotational velocity of 3 km/s. The star has 110% of the mass of the Sun and 116% times the Sun's radius. It is radiating 160% of the Sun's luminosity from its photosphere at an effective temperature of 5,901 K.

The discovery of a brown dwarf in orbit around HD 131664 was announced on October 26, 2008 and designated HD 131664 b. The object was detected from Doppler measurements of the host star between 2004 and 2008. This object has a minimum mass of 18.15 times that of Jupiter and orbits in a long-period, eccentric orbit that completely overlaps the star's habitable zone. As of 2009, this period (1,951 days or 5.34 years) was among the dozen longest exoplanet periods known. Follow-up studies with data from the Hipparcos and Gaia satellites further constrained the predicted mass of the companion, providing a best estimate of 127.8±17.9 M_{J}, or about 0.12 times the mass of the Sun.
