= Meanings of minor-planet names: 211001–212000 =

As minor planet discoveries are confirmed, they are given a permanent number by the IAU's Minor Planet Center (MPC), and the discoverers can then submit names for them, following the IAU's naming conventions. The list below concerns those minor planets in the specified number-range that have received names, and explains the meanings of those names.

Official naming citations of newly named small Solar System bodies are approved and published in a bulletin by IAU's Working Group for Small Bodies Nomenclature (WGSBN). Before May 2021, citations were published in MPC's Minor Planet Circulars for many decades. Recent citations can also be found on the JPL Small-Body Database (SBDB). Until his death in 2016, German astronomer Lutz D. Schmadel compiled these citations into the Dictionary of Minor Planet Names (DMP) and regularly updated the collection.

Based on Paul Herget's The Names of the Minor Planets, Schmadel also researched the unclear origin of numerous asteroids, most of which had been named prior to World War II. This article incorporates text from this source, which is in the public domain: SBDB New namings may only be added to this list below after official publication as the preannouncement of names is condemned. The WGSBN publishes a comprehensive guideline for the naming rules of non-cometary small Solar System bodies.

== 211001–211100 ==
Named minor planet	Provisional	This minor planet was named for...	Ref · Catalog
211021 Johnpercin	2001 YC_{159}	John Percin Jr. (1989–2013), one of the 19 elite Prescott's Granite Mountain Hotshot firefighters who died battling a blaze on a ridge in Yarnell, Arizona, United States	JPL · 211021
211077 Hongkang	2002 CT_{271}	Hong Kyu Kang (b. 1964), an American senior staff engineer at Johns Hopkins Applied Physics Laboratory.	IAU · 211077

== 211101–211200 ==
back to top

Named minor planet	Provisional	This minor planet was named for...	Ref · Catalog
211106 Francinewetzel	2002 EN_{151}	Francine Wetzel (b. 1992) worked full time as an LPL administrator while earning her Masters at the University of Arizona.	IAU · 211106
211172 Tarantola	2002 JX_{10}	Albert Tarantola (1949–2009) was a visionary geophysicist who made seminal contributions to Inverse Problem Theory. He was the first to use inversion methods to image the Earth's interior using seismic waveforms.	JPL · 211172

== 211201–211300 ==
back to top

Named minor planet	Provisional	This minor planet was named for...	Ref · Catalog
211232 Kellykevin	2002 PW_{144}	Kevin Kelly (b. 1957), an American formerly serving as a staff member in the United States Senate, now a private citizen	IAU · 211232

== 211301–211400 ==
back to top

Named minor planet	Provisional	This minor planet was named for...	Ref · Catalog
211343 Dieterhusar	2002 TJ_{68}	Dieter Husar (born 1947), a German physicist and amateur astronomer	JPL · 211343
211374 Anthonyrose	2002 TN_{309}	Anthony Rose (1990–2013), one of the 19 Granite Mountain Hotshots who died fighting the 2013 Yarnell Hill Fire in Arizona	JPL · 211374
211375 Jessesteed	2002 TS_{326}	Jesse Steed (1977–2013), one of the 19 Granite Mountain Hotshots who died fighting the 2013 Yarnell Hill Fire in Arizona	JPL · 211375
211376 Joethurston	2002 TT_{330}	Joe Thurston (1981–2013), one of the 19 Granite Mountain Hotshots who died fighting the 2013 Yarnell Hill Fire in Arizona	JPL · 211376
211377 Travisturbyfill	2002 TK_{333}	Travis Turbyfill (1986–2013), one of the 19 Granite Mountain Hotshots who died fighting the 2013 Yarnell Hill Fire in Arizona	JPL · 211377
211378 Williamwarneke	2002 TF_{334}	William Warneke (1988–2013), one of the 19 Granite Mountain Hotshots who died fighting the 2013 Yarnell Hill Fire in Arizona	JPL · 211378
211379 Claytonwhitted	2002 TH_{334}	Clayton Whitted (1985–2013), one of the 19 Granite Mountain Hotshots who died fighting the 2013 Yarnell Hill Fire in Arizona	JPL · 211379
211380 Kevinwoyjeck	2002 TY_{336}	Kevin Woyjeck (1992–2013), one of the 19 Granite Mountain Hotshots who died fighting the 2013 Yarnell Hill Fire in Arizona	JPL · 211380
211381 Garretzuppiger	2002 TZ_{343}	Garret Zuppiger (1986–2013), one of the 19 Granite Mountain Hotshots who died fighting the 2013 Yarnell Hill Fire in Arizona	JPL · 211381

== 211401–211500 ==
back to top

Named minor planet	Provisional	This minor planet was named for...	Ref · Catalog
211473 Herin	2003 ER_{1}	Thierry Herin (born 1966), a French amateur astronomer	JPL · 211473

== 211501–211600 ==
back to top

Named minor planet	Provisional	This minor planet was named for...	Ref · Catalog
There are no named minor planets in this number range

== 211601–211700 ==
back to top

Named minor planet	Provisional	This minor planet was named for...	Ref · Catalog
211613 Christophelovis	2003 UB_{30}	Christophe Lovis (born 1977), Swiss astrophysicist and member of the extrasolar planet group at Geneva University. He co-discovered three Neptune-sized exoplanets – HD 69830 b, HD 69830 c, and HD 69830 d – around the star HD 69830.	JPL · 211613

== 211701–211800 ==
back to top

Named minor planet	Provisional	This minor planet was named for...	Ref · Catalog
There are no named minor planets in this number range

== 211801–211900 ==
back to top

Named minor planet	Provisional	This minor planet was named for...	Ref · Catalog
There are no named minor planets in this number range

== 211901–212000 ==
back to top

Named minor planet	Provisional	This minor planet was named for...	Ref · Catalog
211977 Springob	2005 AX_{26}	Christopher M. Springob (1977–2022), an American extragalactic astronomer and data scientist.	IAU · 211977

back to top

Preceded by 210,001–211,000	Meanings of minor-planet names List of minor planets: 211,001–212,000	Succeeded by 212,001–213,000
