= Stewardship Contracting Reauthorization and Improvement Act =

- Long title: A bill to amend the Healthy Forests Restoration Act of 2003 to provide for the conduct of stewardship end result contracting projects.
- Announced in: the 113th United States Congress
- Sponsored by: U.S. Senator Jeff Flake (R-AZ)
- Number of co-sponsors: 10

Codification
- U.S.C. sections affected: 16 U.S.C. § 6591
- Agencies affected: Bureau of Land Management, U.S. Forest Service, U.S. Department of the Interior

Legislative history
- Introduced in the Senate as S. 1300 by Jeff Flake (R–AZ), John McCain (R–AZ), Mike Crapo (R–ID), James Risch (R–ID), Dean Heller (R–NV) on July 16, 2013; Committee consideration by United States Senate Committee on Energy and Natural Resources. Passed by committee on December 19, 2013.

The Stewardship Contracting Reauthorization and Improvement Act (S. 1300) was a bill introduced in the 113th Congress by U.S. Senator Jeff Flake. The bill would have given the federal government more authority to enter into what are known as "forest stewardship contracts", with the goal of reducing the risk of forest wildfires.

In July 2013, Senator Flake warned the public that the legal authority for forest stewardship contracts would end by September 2013, and without extending the authority, Flake argued that the U.S. Forest Service would lose an important firefighting tool. The bill, which Flake introduced that month, would extend the legal authority for forest stewardship contracts until 2023.

== Background ==
Stewardship end result contracting is a flexible set of contracting tools designed to help federal land management agencies and their partners restore public lands and provide local community benefits. S. 1300 would permanently reauthorize stewardship contracting authority for the Forest Service and Bureau of Land Management.

— U.S. Senate Report 113-179

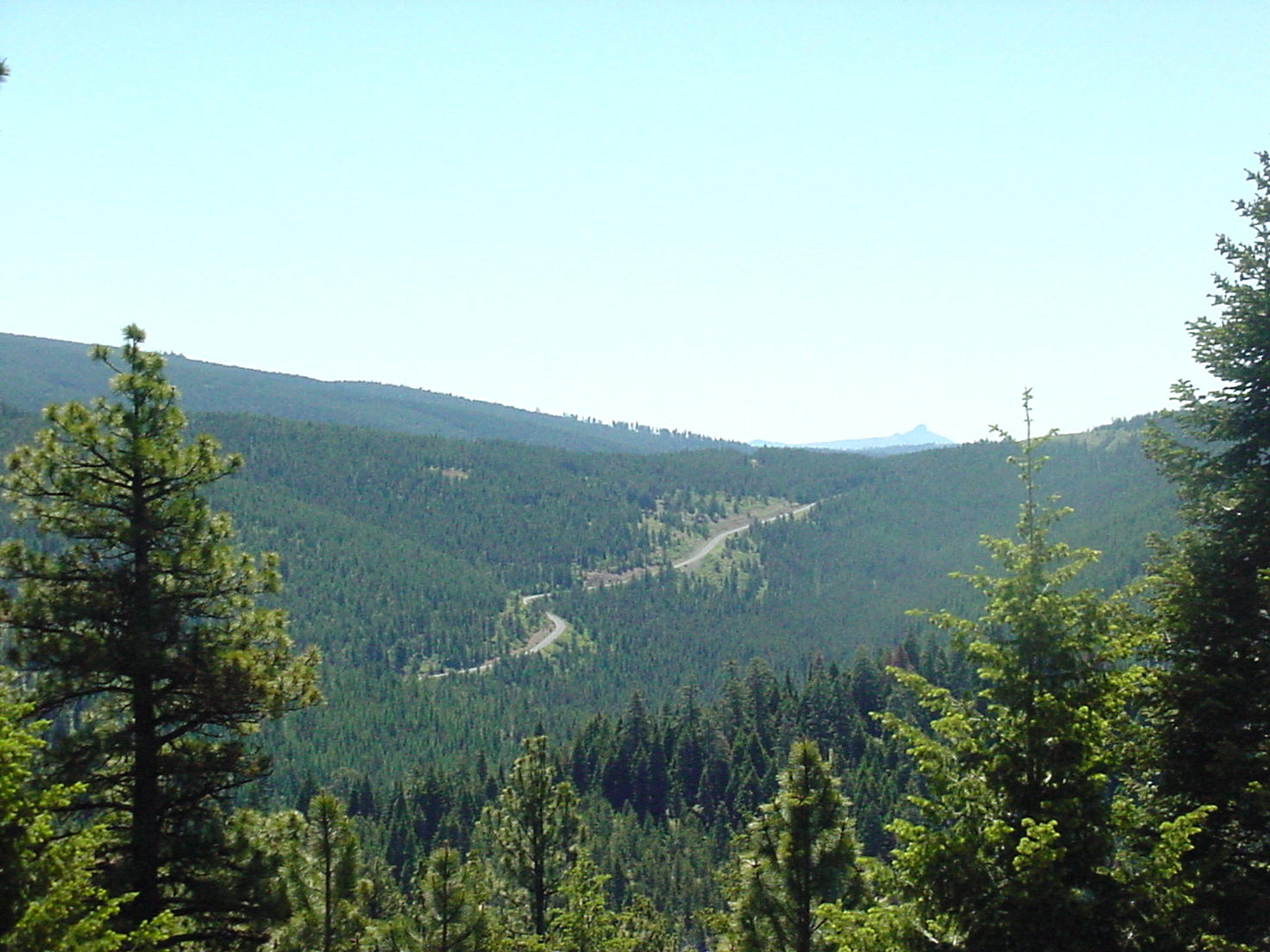
In 2013, the Forest Service and local organizations in Oregon began constructing a forest stewardship contract for Malheur National Forest, shown here.

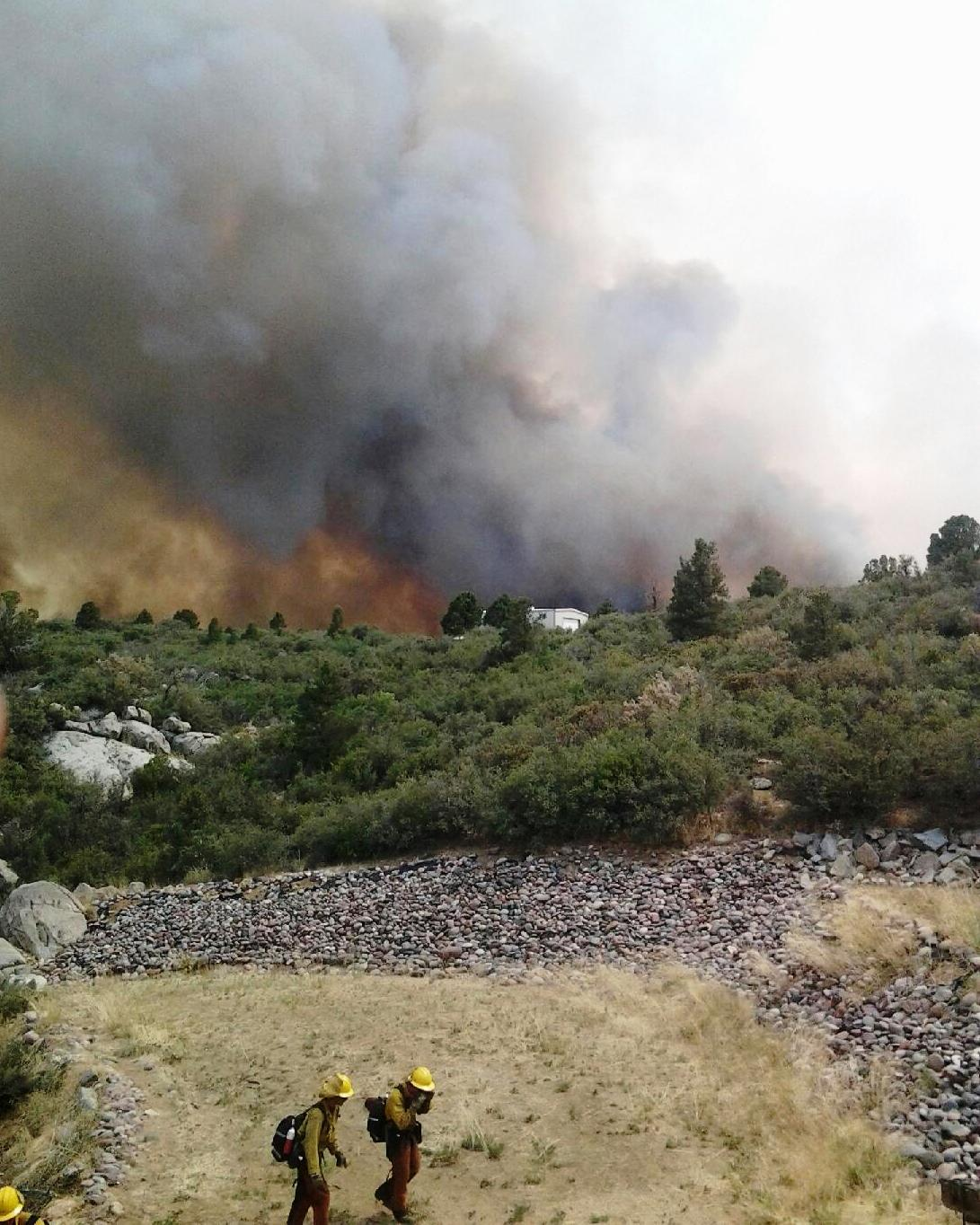
The Yarnell Hill Fire started in Yarnell, Arizona, on June 28, 2013. Within two days, the fire killed 19 City of Prescott firefighters, members of the Granite Mountain Hotshots. The wildfire was fully contained by July 10, 2013. The fire caused the highest wildland firefighter death toll in the United States since the 1933 Griffith Park Fire killed 29 firefighters, and the highest death toll from any U.S. wildfire since the 1991 East Bay Hills fire killed 25 people. The Stewardship Contracting Reauthorization and Improvement Act seeks to reduce the risk of wildfires in the United States.

A forest stewardship contract is a type of contract between the U.S. Forest Service and other parties, such as forest industry companies and local government agencies. The contracts are centered around a specific piece of National Forest System land.

The contract can include an agreements on a number of forest projects. For example, a contract could give a company the right to conduct a limited amount of timber and forest restoration work.

Other examples of projects that could be included in a stewardship contract are prescribed burning (for fire prevention), road maintenance, watershed or stream rehabilitation, and the sale of forest products off the same piece of land.

When creating a forest stewardship contract, the Forest Service works with and takes input from several parties such as state and local governments, environmental conservation groups, Native American tribes, and fire safety councils.

If the contract allows forest products, such as timber, to be cut down and sold, the money from the sale is used to offset other activities spelled out in the contract.

In 2012, around 25 percent of all timber taken from National Forest System land was sold under a stewardship contract.

== Arizona wildfires ==
The western United States, and Arizona in particular, suffers from a large number of wildfires every year. In an editorial published on April 25, 2014, The Arizona Republic newspaper wrote the following about wildfires in Arizona and other western states: "Washington, D.C., has not yet intellectually grasped the fact that wildfires in the Western states are every bit as devastating to drought-stricken Arizona, New Mexico and other Western states as hurricanes are to the Gulf Coast and tornadoes are to the Midwest."

In May 2014, a wildfire prompted the evacuation of over 3,000 residents in Coconino County, Arizona. The fire burned thousands of acres between Flagstaff and Sedona. Over 960 firefighters, 15 "hotshot" crews, and three air tankers were required to fight the fire.

== Major provisions ==
Extension of stewardship program

The bill extends the stewardship program another ten years, until the year 2023.

Reserve funds for cancelled contracts

Due to federal rules, the government usually must hold onto the money for a forest stewardship contract for as long as the contract goes on for. Some contracts last up to ten years. The bill would give the government flexibility in how long it holds onto the money, which would help the government cover the cost of canceled contracts.

The bill would allow the government to use any excess income from stewardship contracts to pay for canceled contracts. Currently, the government must pay for the canceled contract upfront in a lump sum. The bill would change that rule to allow payment in stages. According to the Senate committee report on the bill, this change is consistent with rules that the Department of Defense uses in its contracts.

Fire liability

The bill makes the fire liability provisions of the stewardship contracts equal to the fire liability provisions in timber contracts. Timber contracts have a ceiling on how much fire liability the contractor must carry, but stewardship contracts do not have a ceiling. According to the Senate committee report on the bill, the lack of a ceiling can make stewardship contracts uneconomical for companies bidding on them.

== Legislative history ==
In the late 1990s, Congress passed legislation that created a pilot program for stewardship contracts. In 2003, Congress expanded the stewardship program and authorized it to run until 2013.

On July 16, 2013, Senators Flake introduced the bill, along with four original cosponsors: Senators McCain, Crapo, Risch, and Heller. The Senate Subcommittee on Public Lands, Forests, and Mining held a public hearing on the bill on July 30. On December 19, the Senate Committee on Energy and Natural Resources passed the bill by a voice vote.

== Related bills ==
The Library of Congress has identified two other bills in Congress that are similar to S. 1300:

- S. 816 - Stewardship End Result Contracting Project Act, introduced by Senator Mark Udall (D-CO)
- S. 849 - Permanent Stewardship Contracting Authority Act of 2013, introduced by Senator Michael Bennet (D-CO)

== See also ==
- List of bills in the 113th United States Congress
- Yarnell Hill Fire
- Wallow Fire
- List of California wildfires
- List of Colorado wildfires

== Gallery of Arizona wildfires ==
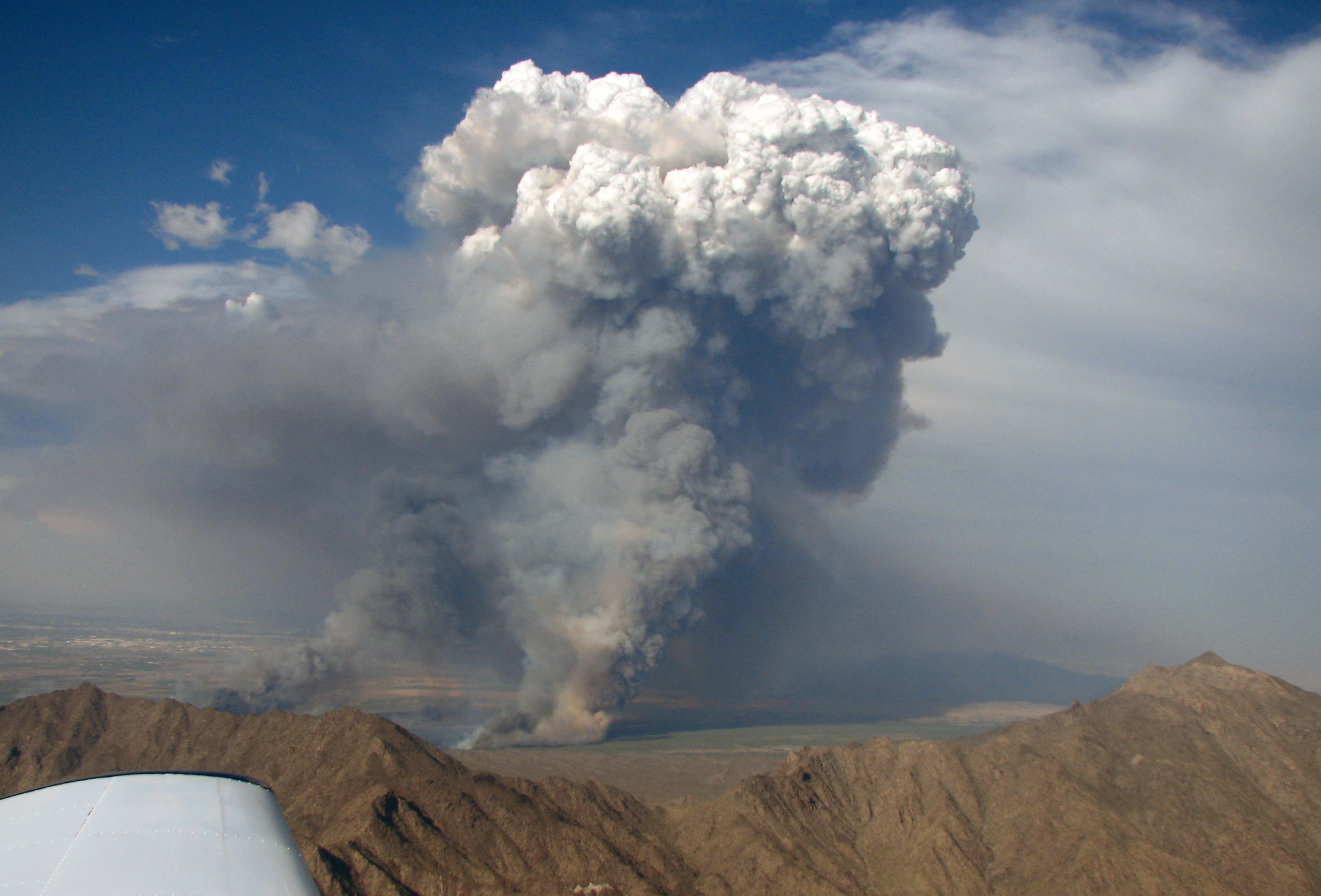
A photograph of a well-developed Pyrocumulus cloud produced by a bushfire in the Gila River valley southwest of Phoenix, Arizona.

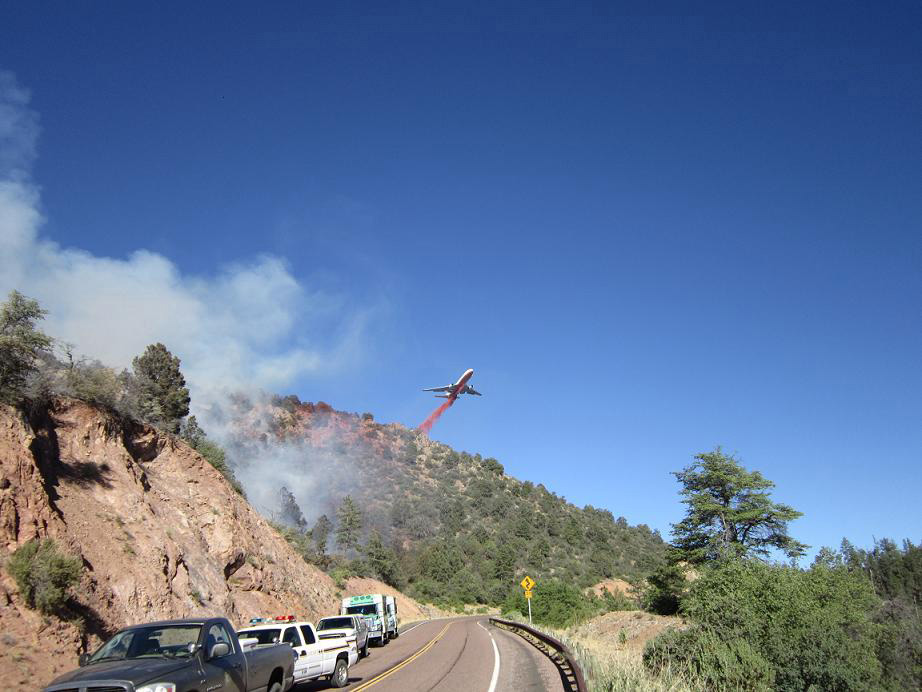
A DC-10 air tanker drops fire retardant on the Poco Wildfire in Tonto National Forest in Arizona on June 14, 2012.

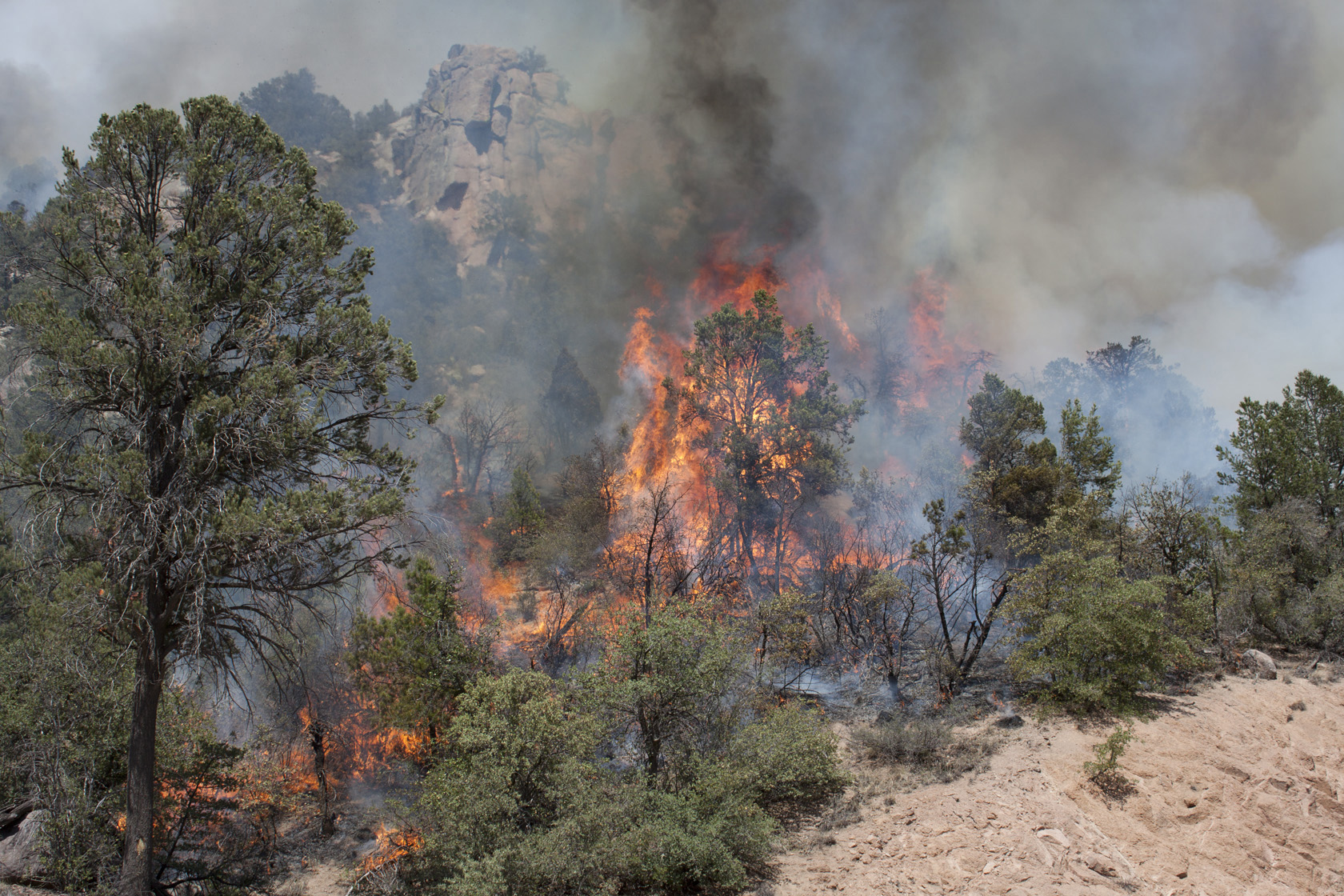
A fire burns through brush and trees at the Poco Wildfire in Tonto National Forest near Young, Arizona on June 21, 2012.

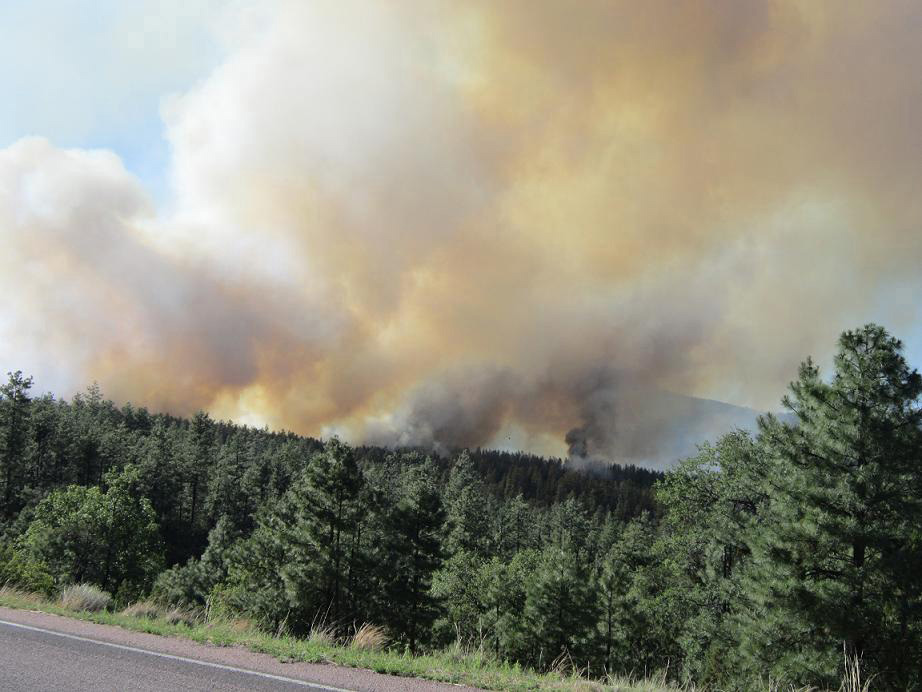
Spot fires ahead of the main Poco Wildfire in the Tonto National Forest near Young, AZ on June 16, 2012.

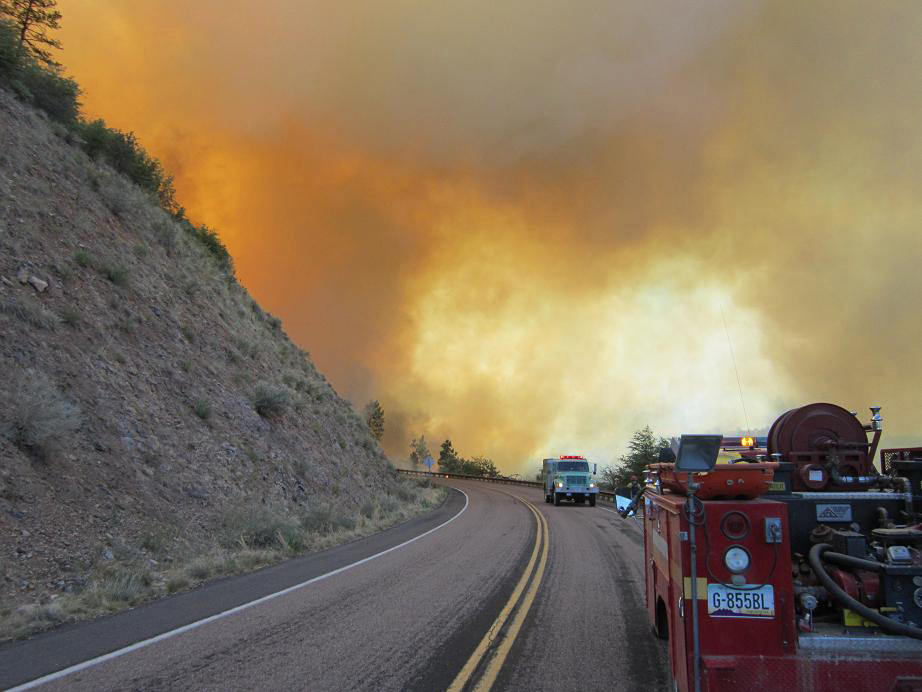
The Poco Wildfire jumps Fire Road 512 in the Tonto National Forest near Young, AZ on June 14, 2012.

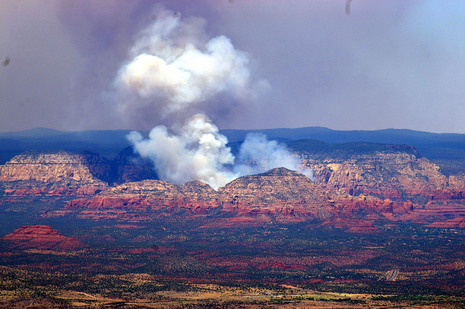
A wildfire in Sedona, Arizona
