= List of the deadliest firefighter disasters in the United States =

Below is a list of the deadliest firefighter disasters in the United States, in which more than five firefighters died. "Firefighter" is defined as a professional trained to fight fires. Hence the 1933 Griffith Park fire is excluded, as it killed 29 untrained civilians.

== List ==
| Rank | Event | Date | Firefighter Fatalities | Coordinates | Reference |
|---|---|---|---|---|---|
| 1 | September 11 attacks | September 11, 2001 | 343 | 40°42′46.8″N 74°0′48.6″W | |
| 2 | Great Fire of 1910 | August 22, 1910 | 78 (Note: Another source says that there were 86 deaths, but this seems to count almost all of the civilians as well.) | 47°25′34″N 116°6′13″W | |
| 3 | Texas City disaster | April 16, 1947 | 27 | 29°22′39″N 94°53′29″W | |
| 4 | Chicago Union Stock Yards fire (1910) | December 22, 1910 | 21 | 41°49′8.31″N 87°39′40.08″W | |
| 6 | McKee refinery fire | July 29, 1956 | 19 | 35°57′21.28″N 101°53′11.49″W | |
| 6 | Yarnell Hill Fire | June 30, 2013 | 19 | 34°14′47.84″N 112°45′20.94″W | |
| 8 | Blackwater fire of 1937 | August 21, 1937 | 15 | 44°24′43″N 109°44′30″W | |
| 8 | Rattlesnake Fire | July 9, 1953 | 15 | 39°39′19.05″N 122°38′9.67″W | |
| 10 | South Canyon Fire | July 6, 1994 | 14 | 39°34′26.48″N 107°25′36.82″W | |
| 11 | Strand Theatre fire (Brockton, Massachusetts) | March 10, 1941 | 13 | 42°4′58.40″N 71°1′9.58″W | |
| 11 | Mann Gulch fire | August 4, 1949 | 13 | 46°52′46.56″N 111°54′17.64″W | |
| 11 | Friedlander Leather Remnants Factory fire | December 21, 1910 | 13 | 39°58′5.50″N 75°8′29.35″W | |
| 11 | Bowen-Merrill Bookstore Fire | March 17, 1890 | 13 | 39°46′02.7″N 86°09′32.0″W | |
| 15 | Kingman explosion | July 5, 1973 | 12 | 35°12′54.10″N 114°1′48.95″W | |
| 15 | 23rd Street Fire | October 17, 1966 | 12 | 40°44′27.39″N 73°59′20.01″W | |
| 15 | Loop Fire Disaster | November 1, 1966 | 12 | 34°20′05″N 118°23′47″W (Note: Angeles National Forest. Approximately 2,500 feet (760 m) southwest of the Pacoima Dam. Page 12 & 43 of The Loop Fire Report reference has map with the location marked relative to the dam.) | |
| 18 | Inaja Fire | November 25, 1956 | 11 | 33°5′54″N 116°39′50″W | |
| 18 | W. T. Jennings Fire | April 25, 1854 | 11 | 40°42′44″N 74°00′29″W | |
| 20 | West Fertilizer Company explosion | April 17, 2013 | 10 | 31.816°N 97.088°W | |
| 21 | Charleston Sofa Super Store fire | June 18, 2007 | 9 | 40°44′27.39″N 73°59′20.01″W | |
| 21 | Hotel Vendome fire | June 17, 1972 | 9 | 42°21′4.55″N 71°4′43.09″W | |
| 21 | Collins Block Fire (Syracuse, New York) | February 3, 1939 | 9 | 43°3′4.79″N 76°9′12.92″W | |
| 21 | 2008 Carson Helicopters Iron 44 crash | August 5, 2008 | 9 | 40°54′46.8″N 123°15′7.2″W | |
| 24 | Great Boston Fire of 1872 | November 9, 1872 | 8 | 42°21′13.75″N 71°3′30.80″W | |
| 24 | 1975 Philadelphia Gulf refinery fire | August 17, 1975 | 8 | 39°54′7″N 75°12′17″W | |
| 24 | Jackson Pyrotechnic Explosion (Chester, Pennsylvania) | February 17, 1882 | 8 | 39°50′46″N 75°21′24″W | |
| 28 | Woolworth Fire- Charleston WV | March 4, 1949 | 7 | 38°21′00.0″N 81°38′06.1″W | |
| 29 | Waldbaum's supermarket fire | August 2, 1978 | 6 | 40°35′33.93″N 73°57′0.48″W | |
| 29 | Queens soap plant fire | October 26, 1962 | 6 | 40°43′39″N 73°55′24″W | |
| 29 | 1988 Kansas City explosion | November 29, 1988 | 6 | 39°50′47.98″N 94°34′22.49″W | |
| 29 | Worcester Cold Storage and Warehouse Co. fire (Worcester, Massachusetts) | December 3, 1999 | 6 | 42°15′36.23″N 71°47′34.17″W | |
