= Kingman explosion =

1973 propane tanker explosion in Arizona

Coordinates: 35°12′14.7″N 114°01′16.8″W

The Kingman explosion, also known as the Doxol disaster or Kingman BLEVE, was a catastrophic boiling liquid expanding vapor explosion (BLEVE) that occurred on July 5, 1973, in Kingman, Arizona, United States. It killed thirteen people, eleven of them firefighters.

== Description ==
The explosion occurred during a propane transfer from a Doxol railroad car to a storage tank on the Getz rail siding near Andy Devine Avenue/Route 66. The incident began when a hairline crack in the side of the tanker was leaking non-odorized gas that was ignited by static electricity. This caused a spark that ignited the leaking propane gas, facts identified after a long investigation and trial had been conducted. The initial fire badly burned the two railroad employees present, one of whom later died from his burns. The burning propane gas escaping from the valve connection on the rail car quickly heated the liquid propane inside, increasing the tank pressure. This in turn increased the leak and fire, further heating the tank car.

The Kingman Fire Department responded, and began setting up attack lines to cool the propane car. Within minutes of the initial fire, the safety valve on the car opened from the dangerously increased pressure in the tank car. The stream of propane gas blowing out of the safety valve immediately ignited as well. At this point, two burning streams of propane were shooting from the car, one horizontally from the transfer valve, and one vertically from the safety valve. The heat from the streams of burning propane continued to heat the tank, increasing pressure to dangerous levels.

The fire department was in the process of setting up a deluge gun to cool the car, which would have delivered far more water than the booster attack lines they initially were using. Before the deluge gun was readied, the pressure in the tank car reached the design bursting limit, and the car exploded. Almost instantaneously, thousands of gallons of boiling liquid propane flashed to gas with the drop in pressure and simultaneously ignited. The resulting explosion produced a shock wave that was heard and felt for over 5 miles, and a fireball over 1,000 feet in diameter. Burning propane rained down on everything in the vicinity, and the remnants of the rail car were propelled over a quarter mile from the explosion site. The three firefighters closest to the explosion were killed instantly, and eight more died from burns shortly thereafter. In addition to the eleven city firefighters and one railroad worker killed in the disaster, one state trooper was also killed in the explosion.

Those who died were:

- William L. Casson, 52, volunteer fire captain (former fire chief)
- Myron B. (Jimmy) Cox, 55, assistant fire chief, 22-year veteran fireman
- Roger A. Hubka, 27, volunteer firefighter
- Joseph M. Chambers III, 37, 16-year veteran volunteer lieutenant fireman
- Marvin E. Mast, 42, manager of Doxol Gas Co., Korean War veteran
- Arthur C. Stringer, 25, Vietnam veteran and member of the Arizona National Guard, volunteer fireman for one month
- Christopher G. Sanders, 38, captain of Hualapai Fire Department
- Richard Lee Williams, 47, volunteer fireman and principal of Kingman High School
- Frank S. (Butch) Henry, 28, 7-year volunteer fireman
- John O. Campbell, 41, volunteer fireman, head of the Kingman Water Department, assistant city works director, and a Little League manager (died July 16, on the eve of the opening of a Little League tournament)
- Donald G. Webb, 38, volunteer fireman
- Alan Hansen, 34, Arizona highway patrolman and a fireman

Over 90 onlookers gathered on the highway were burned or injured, some badly. The most severely burned, including some of the firefighters, were airlifted to hospitals in Las Vegas and Phoenix. This incident was the worst firefighter tragedy in Arizona until 2013 when 19 Granite Mountain Hotshots firefighters were killed in the Yarnell Hill Fire.

The incident was photographed in detail by a photographer on the roof of his home near the explosion site, and was also captured on 8mm film by a vacationing family. Because of this documentation, this explosion has become a classic incident studied in fire department training programs worldwide. The Arizona State Archives in Phoenix has 24 cubic feet (0.7 m^{3}) of original material, including civil case material and photographs, concerning the "Kingman Explosion." The incident was chronicled in the July 1993 issue of American Fire Journal in an article titled "Kingman Revisited".

== Memorial ==
Firefighters Memorial Park at 2201 Detroit Ave, Kingman AZ is dedicated to the eleven firefighters who died in the explosion.

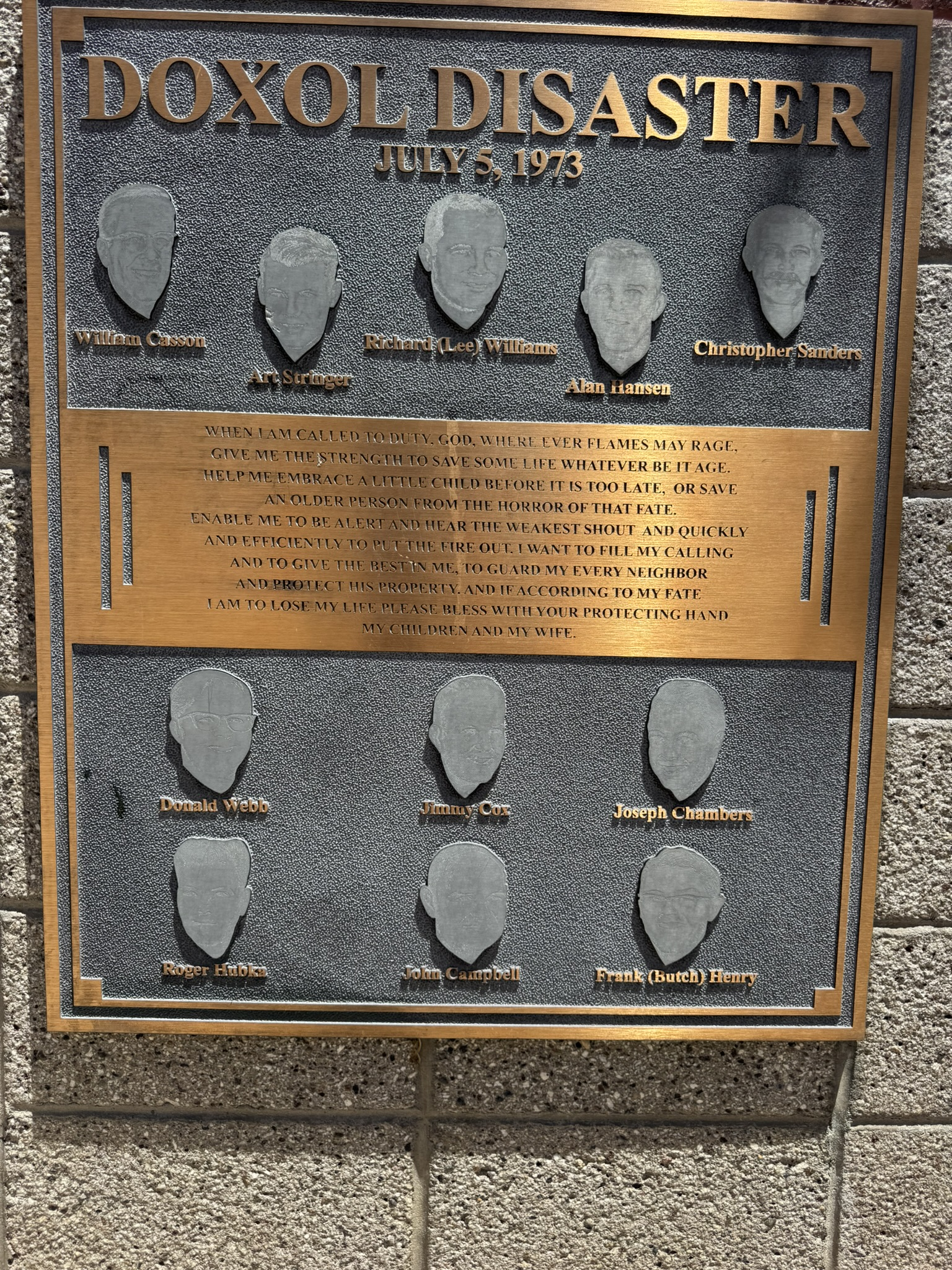

The inscription reads:

DOXOL DISASTER JULY 5, 1973

William Casson Richard (Lee) Williams Christopher Sanders Art Stringer Alan Hansen

WHEN I AM CALLED TO DUTY, GOD, WHERE EVER FLAMES MAY RAGE, GIVE ME THE STRENGTH TO SAVE SOME LIFE WHATEVER BE IT AGE.
HELP ME EMBRACE A LITTLE CHILD BEFORE IT IS TOO LATE, OR SAVE AN OLDER PERSON FROM THE HORROR OF THAT FATE.
ENABLE ME TO BE ALERT AND HEAR THE WEAKEST SHOUT AND QUICKLY AND EFFICIENTLY TO PUT THE FIRE OUT. I WANT TO FILL MY CALLING AND TO GIVE THE BEST IN ME, TO GUARD MY EVERY NEIGHBOR AND PROTECT HIS PROPERTY. AND IF ACCORDING TO MY FATE I AM TO LOSE MY LIFE PLEASE BLESS WITH YOUR PROTECTING HAND MY CHILDREN AND MY WIFE.

Donald Webb Jimmy Cox Joseph Chambers Roger Hubka John Campbell Frank (Butch) Henry

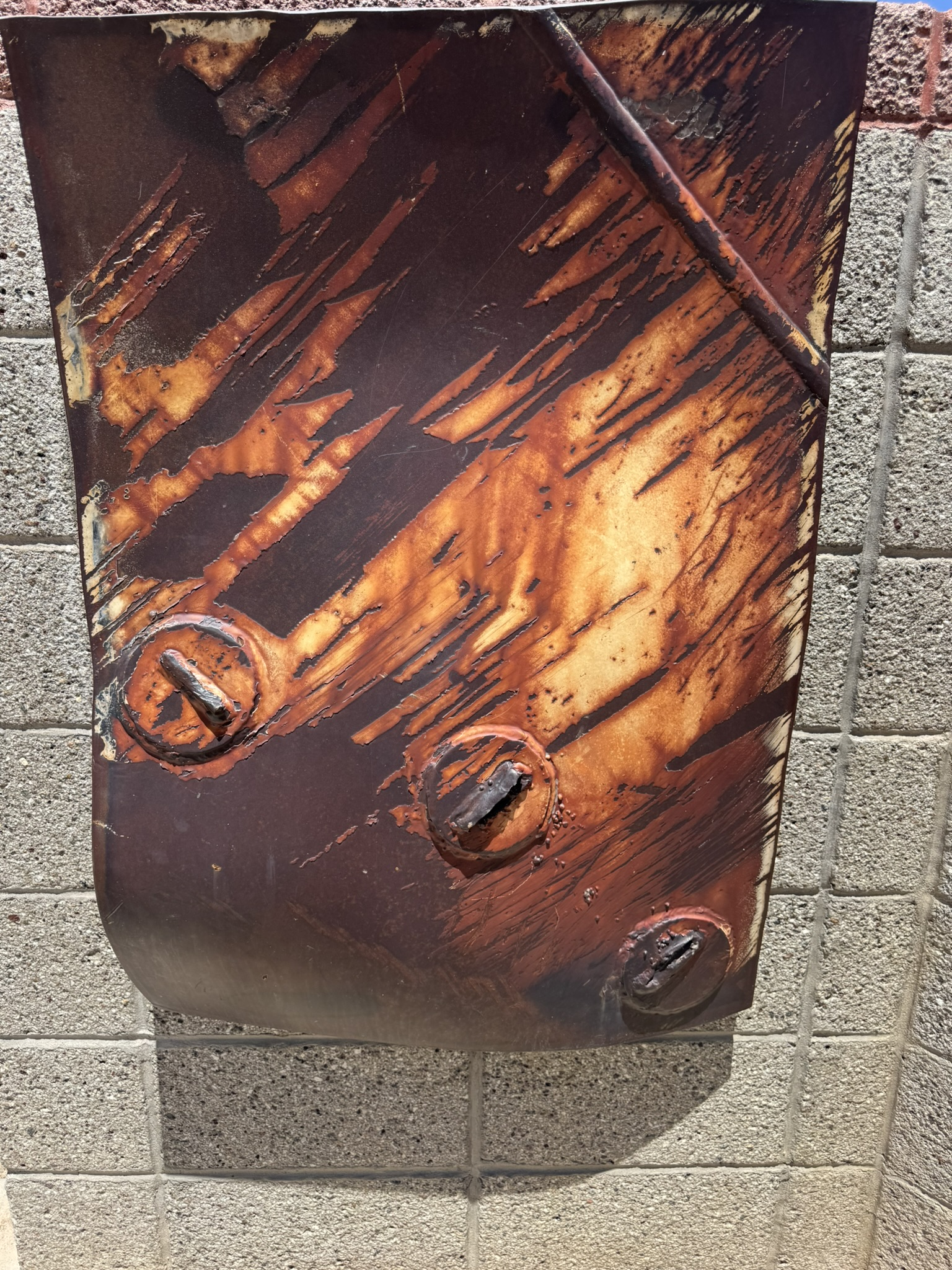

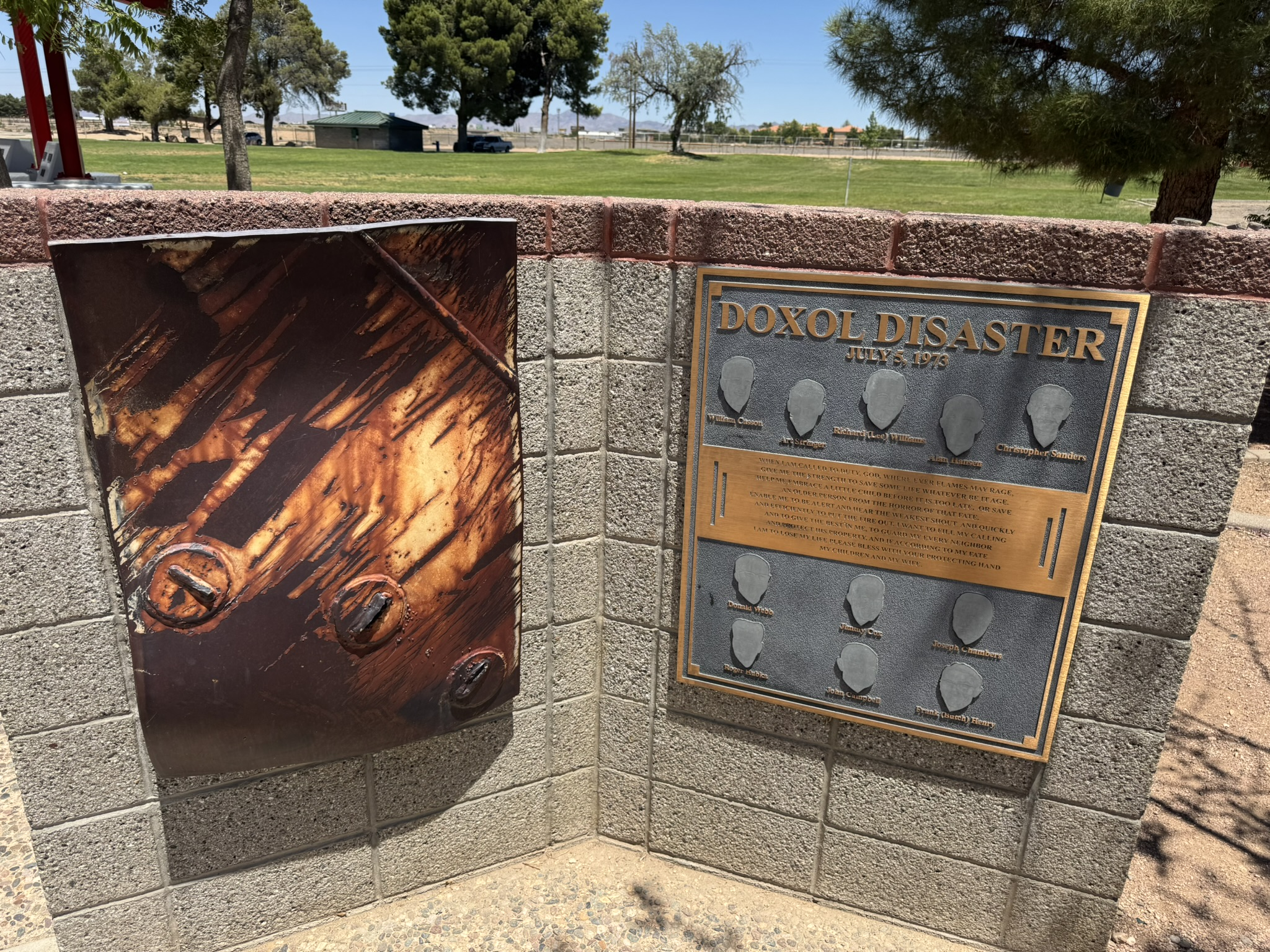

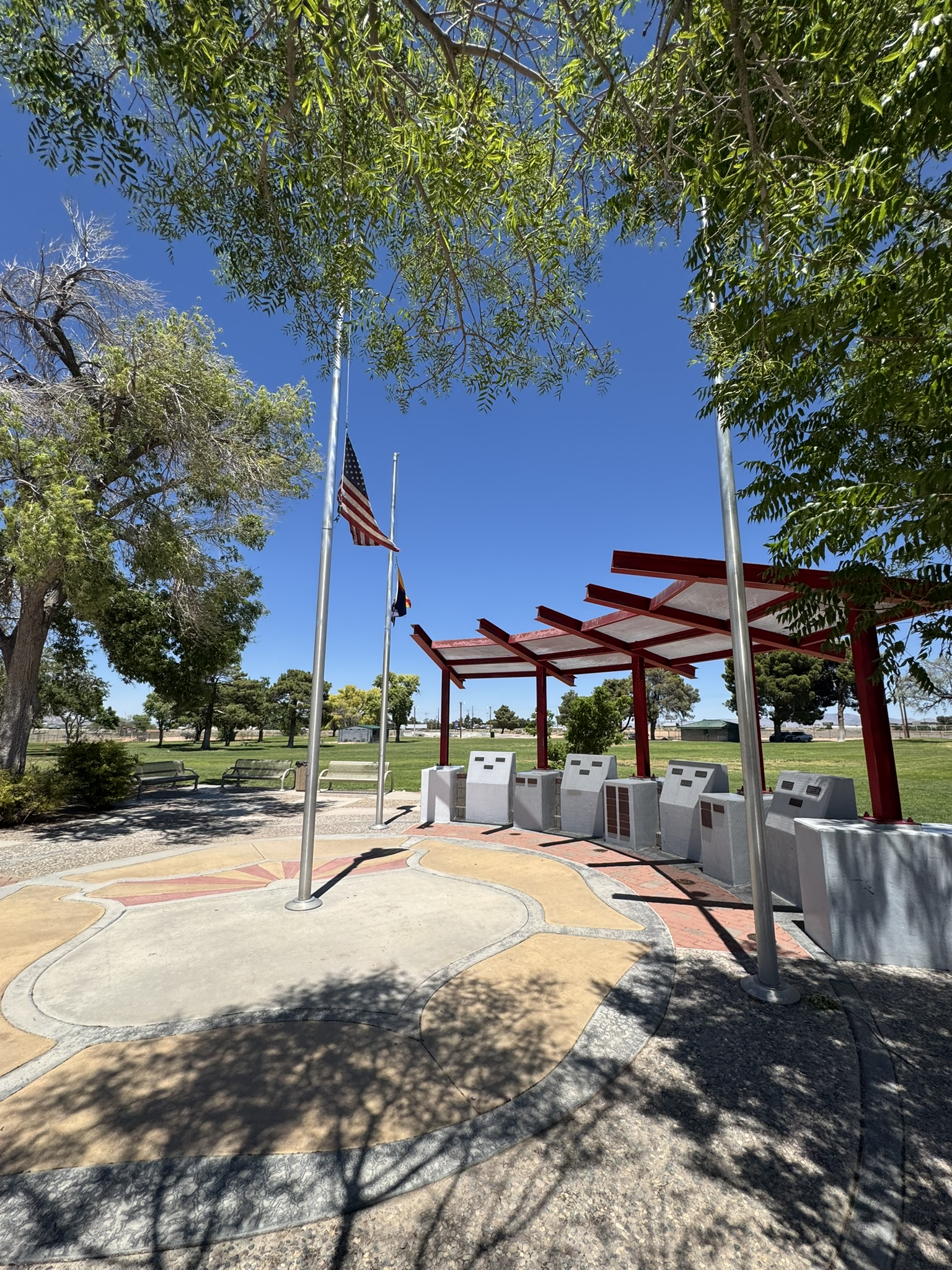

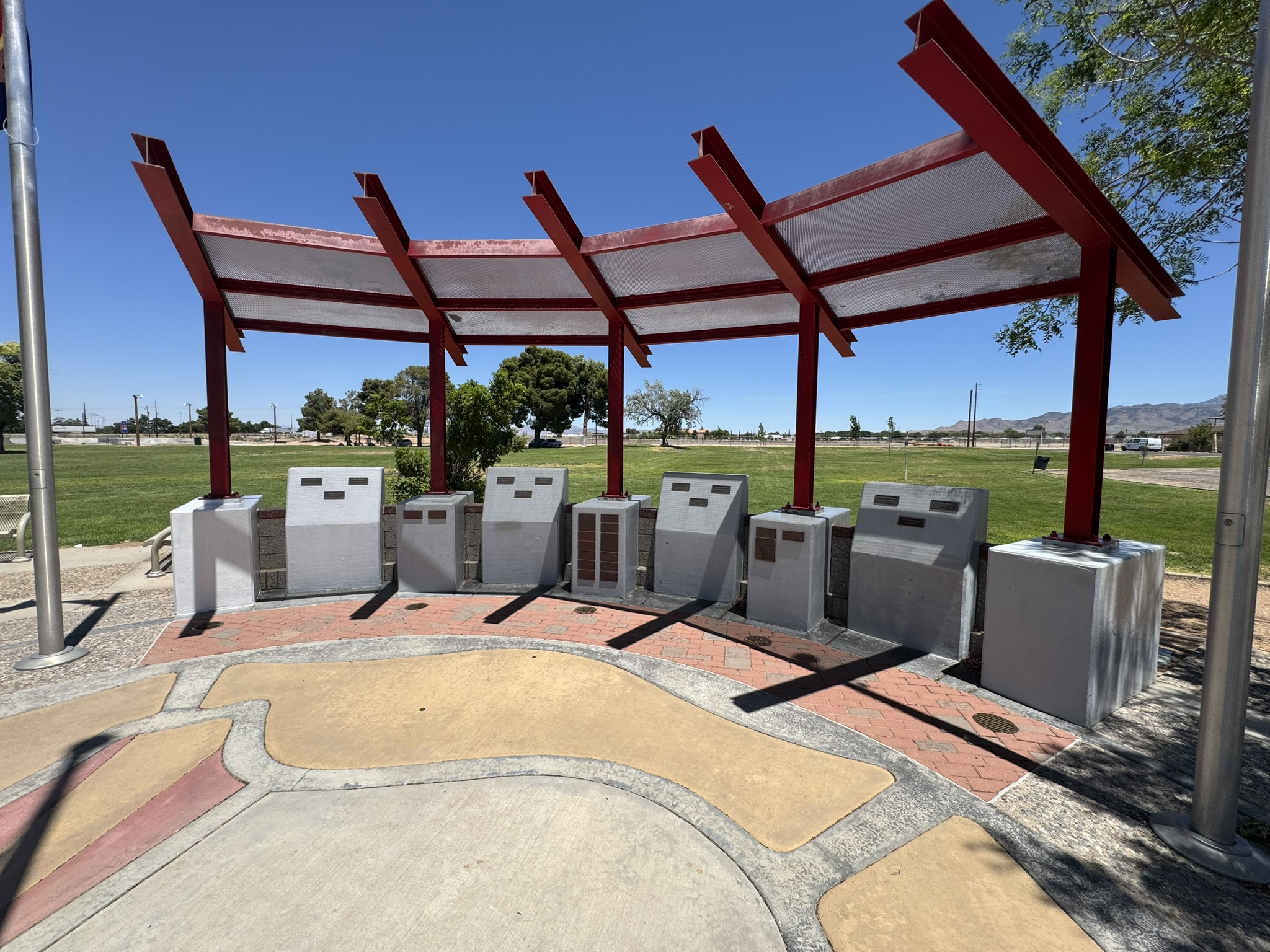

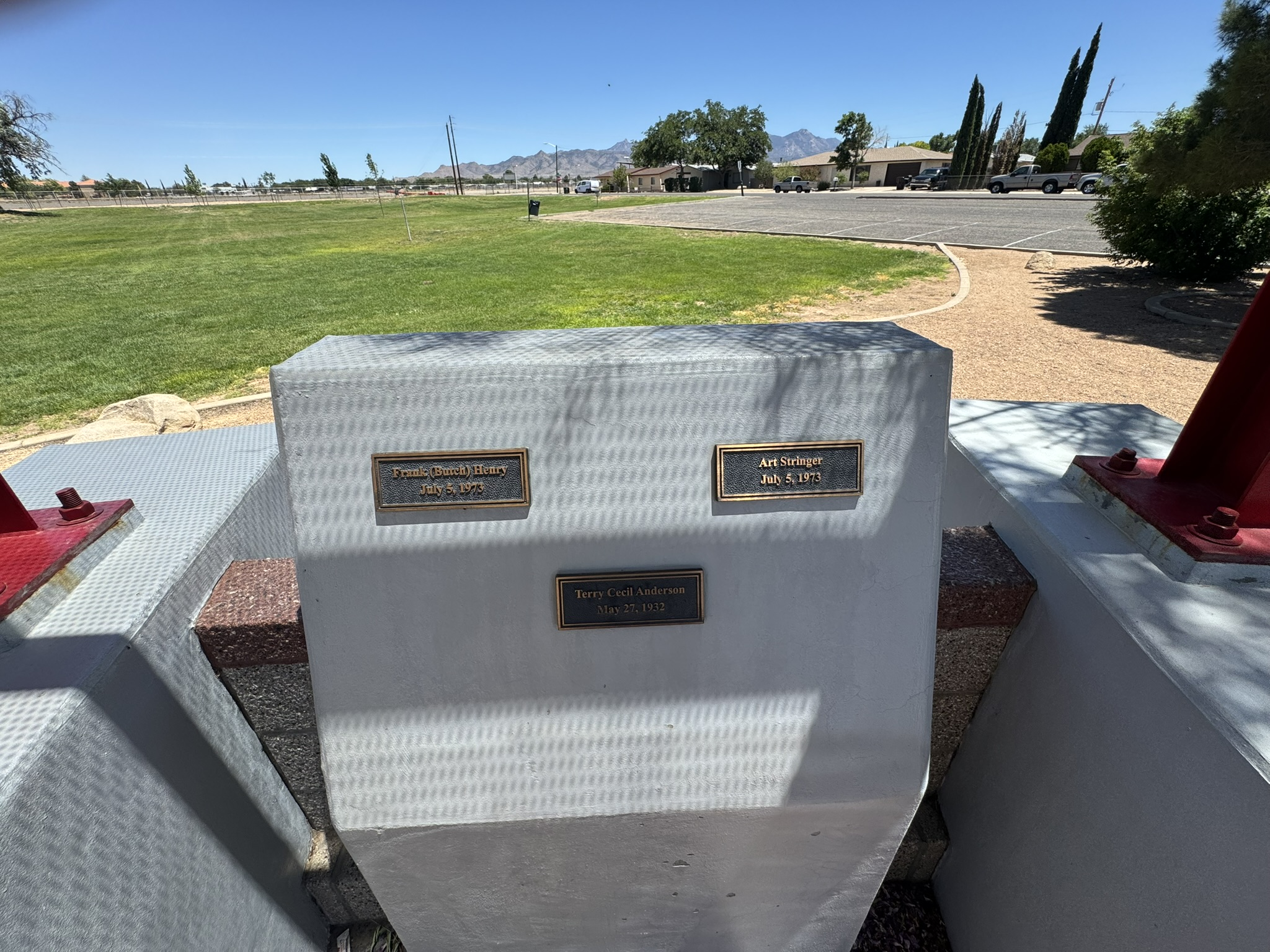

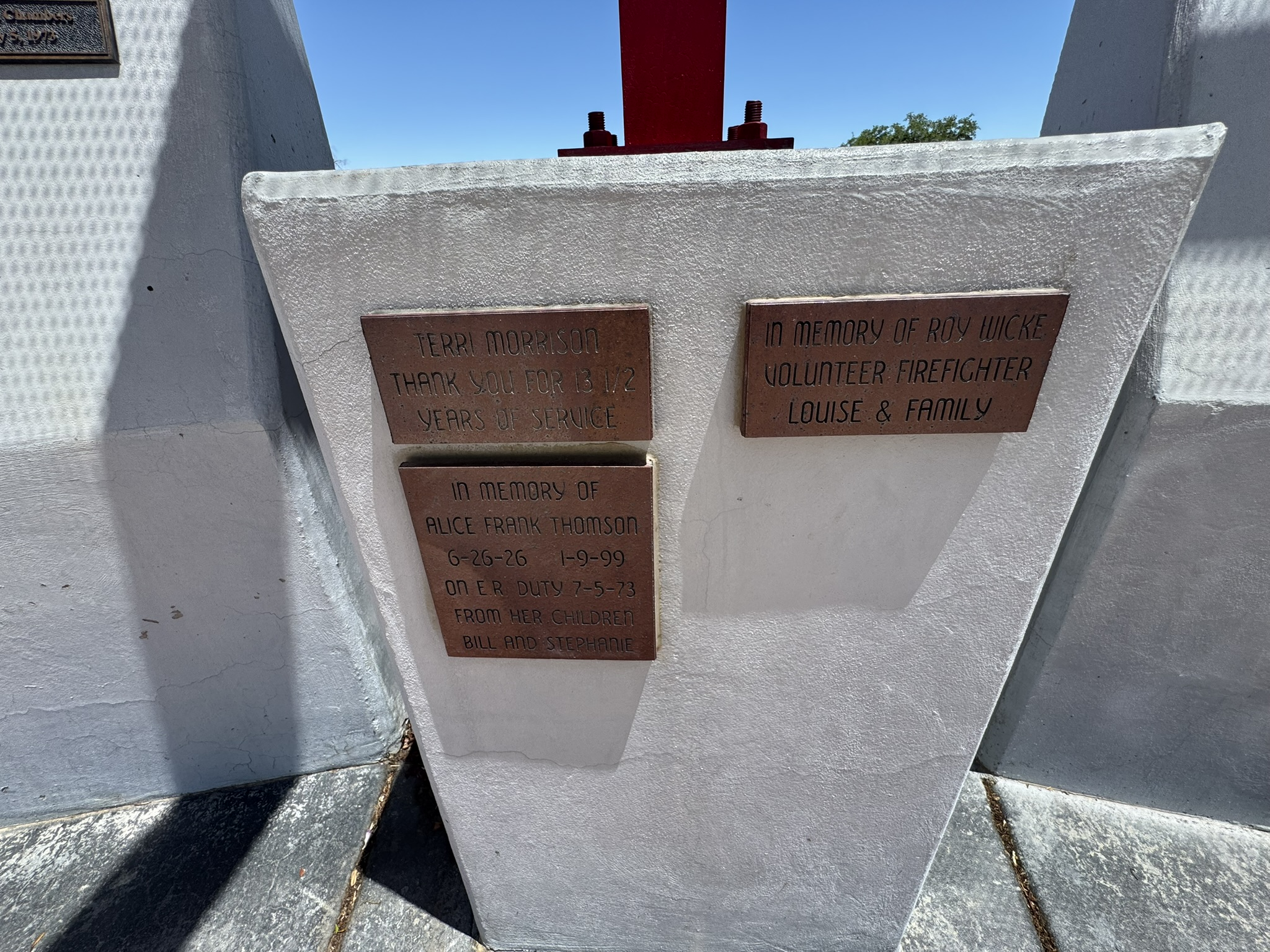

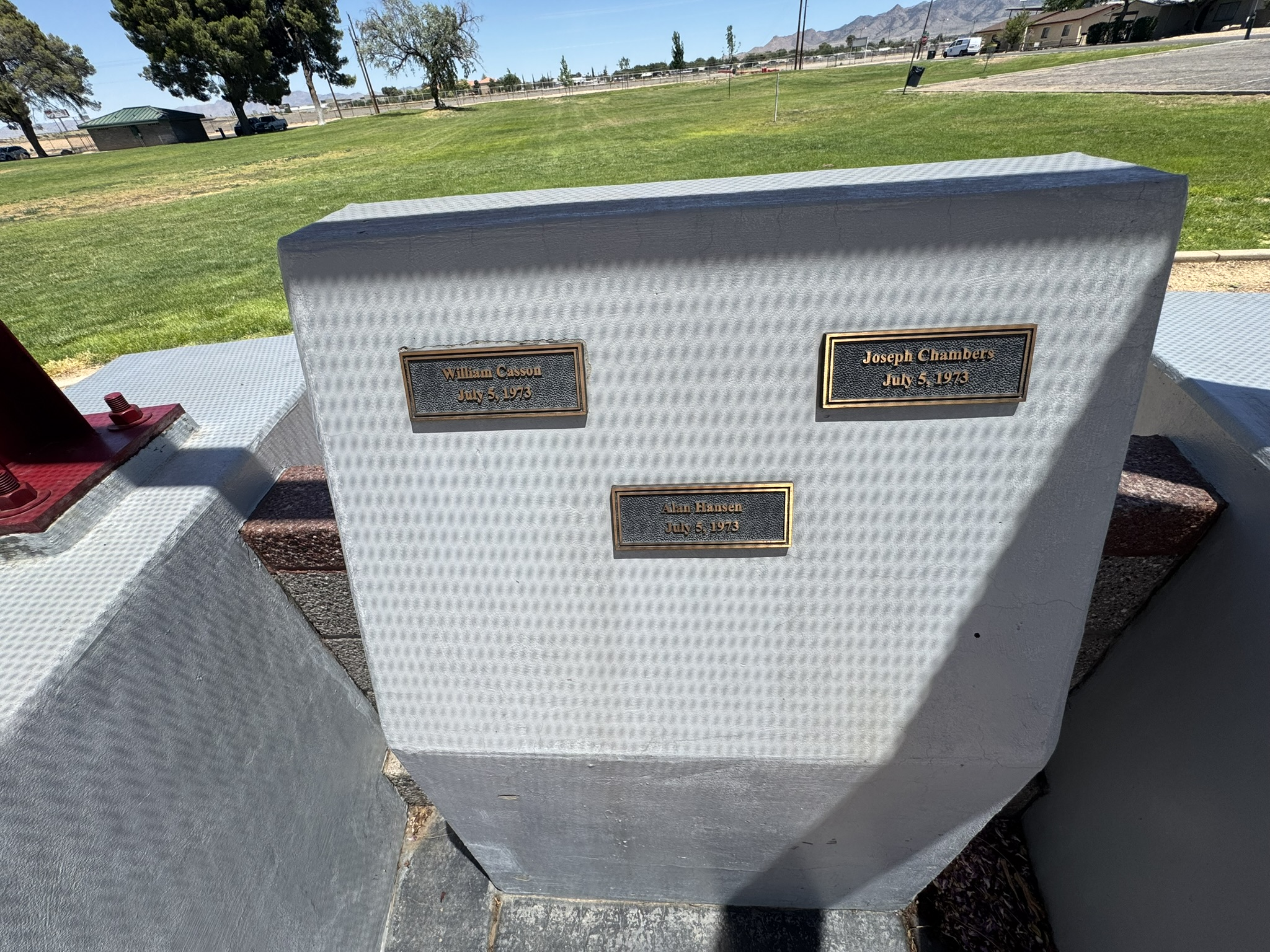

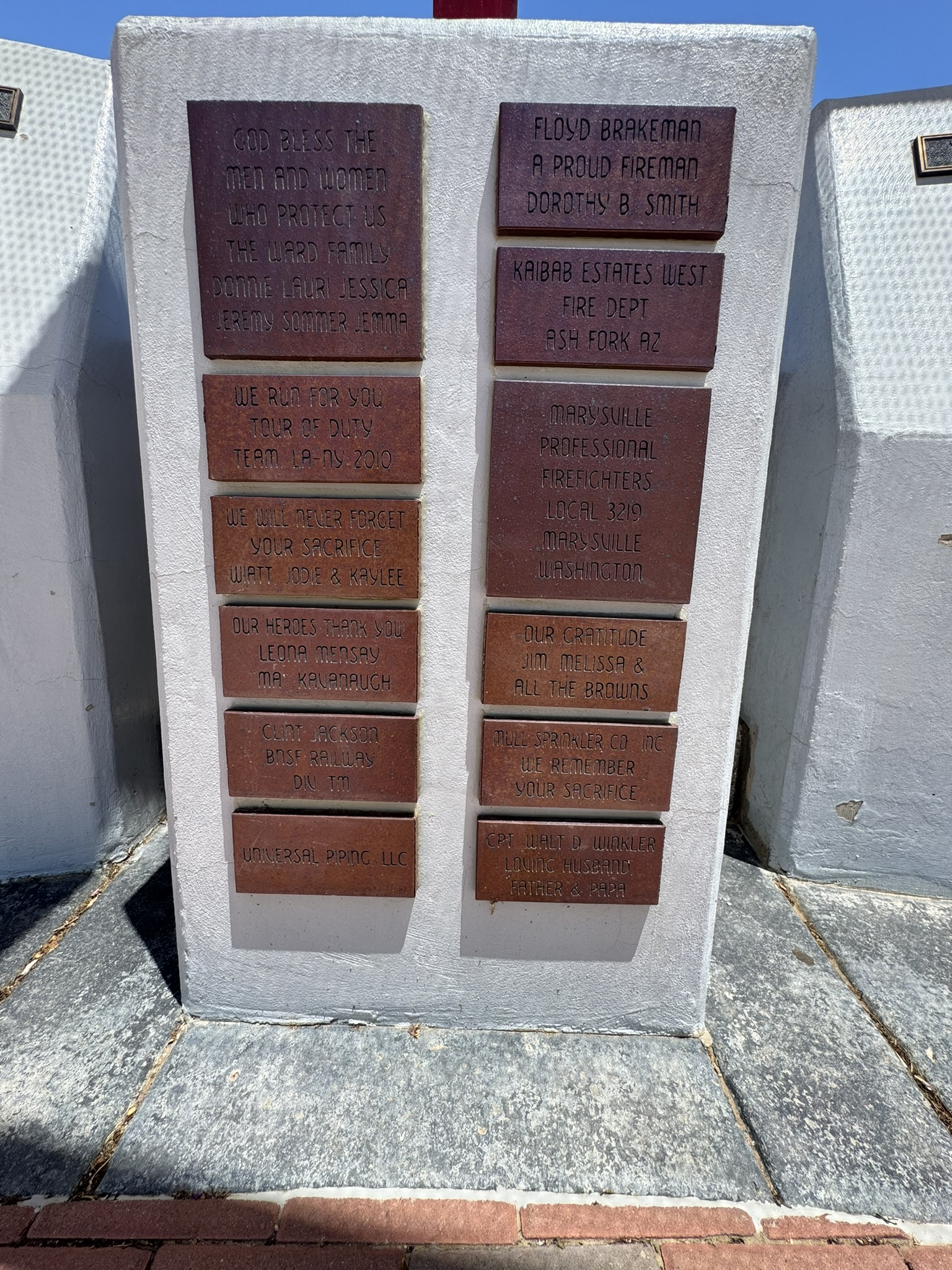

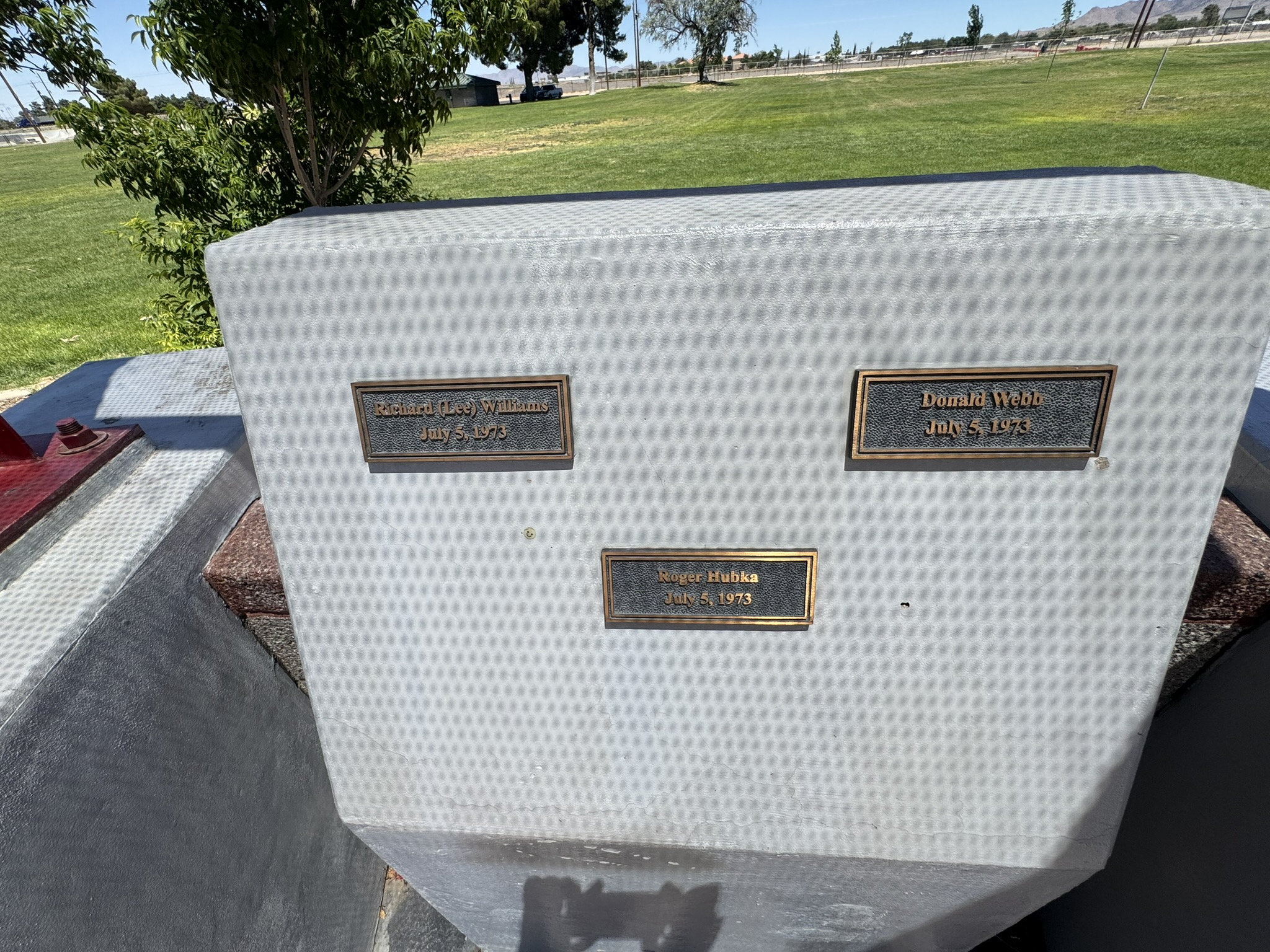

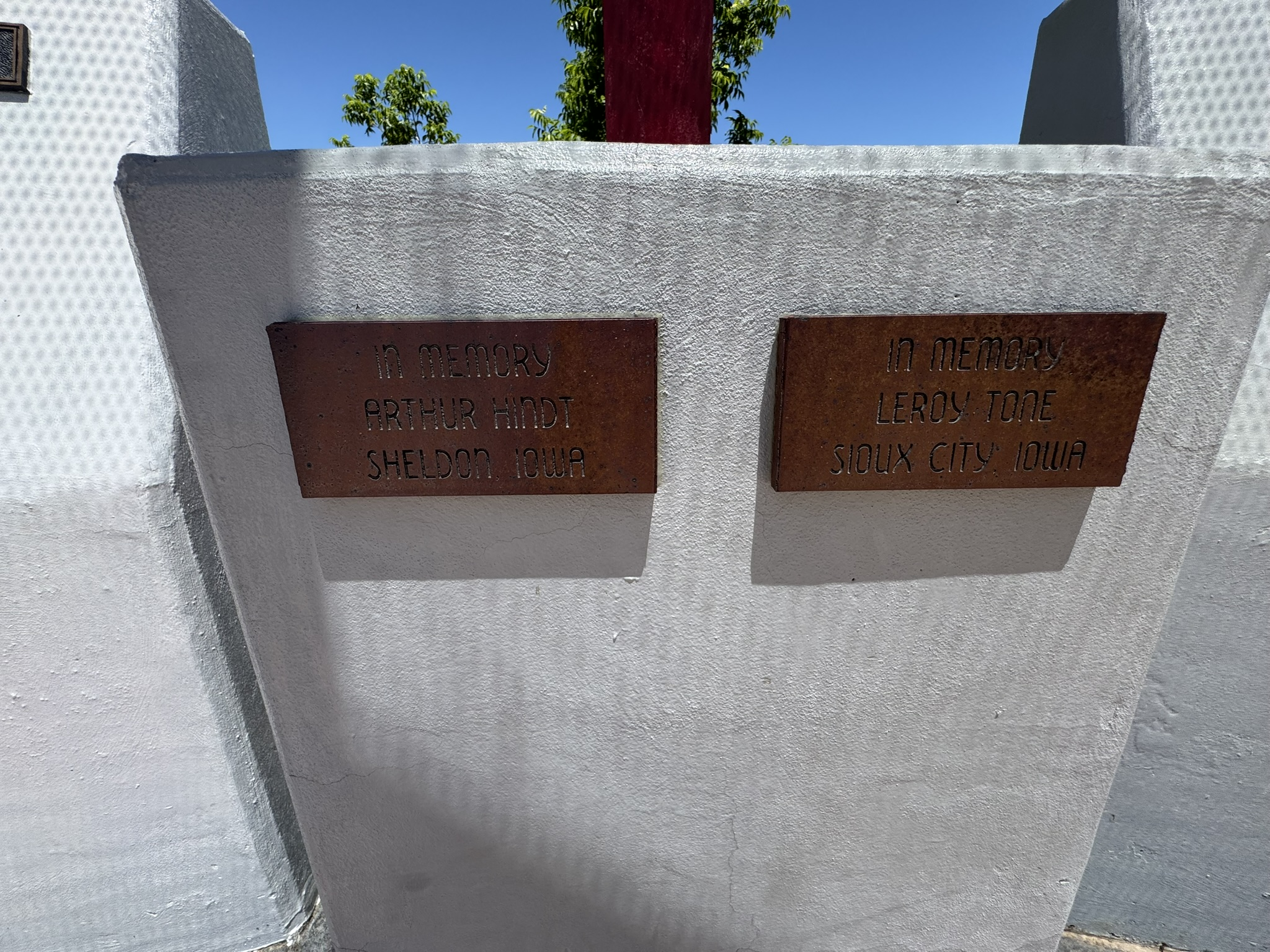

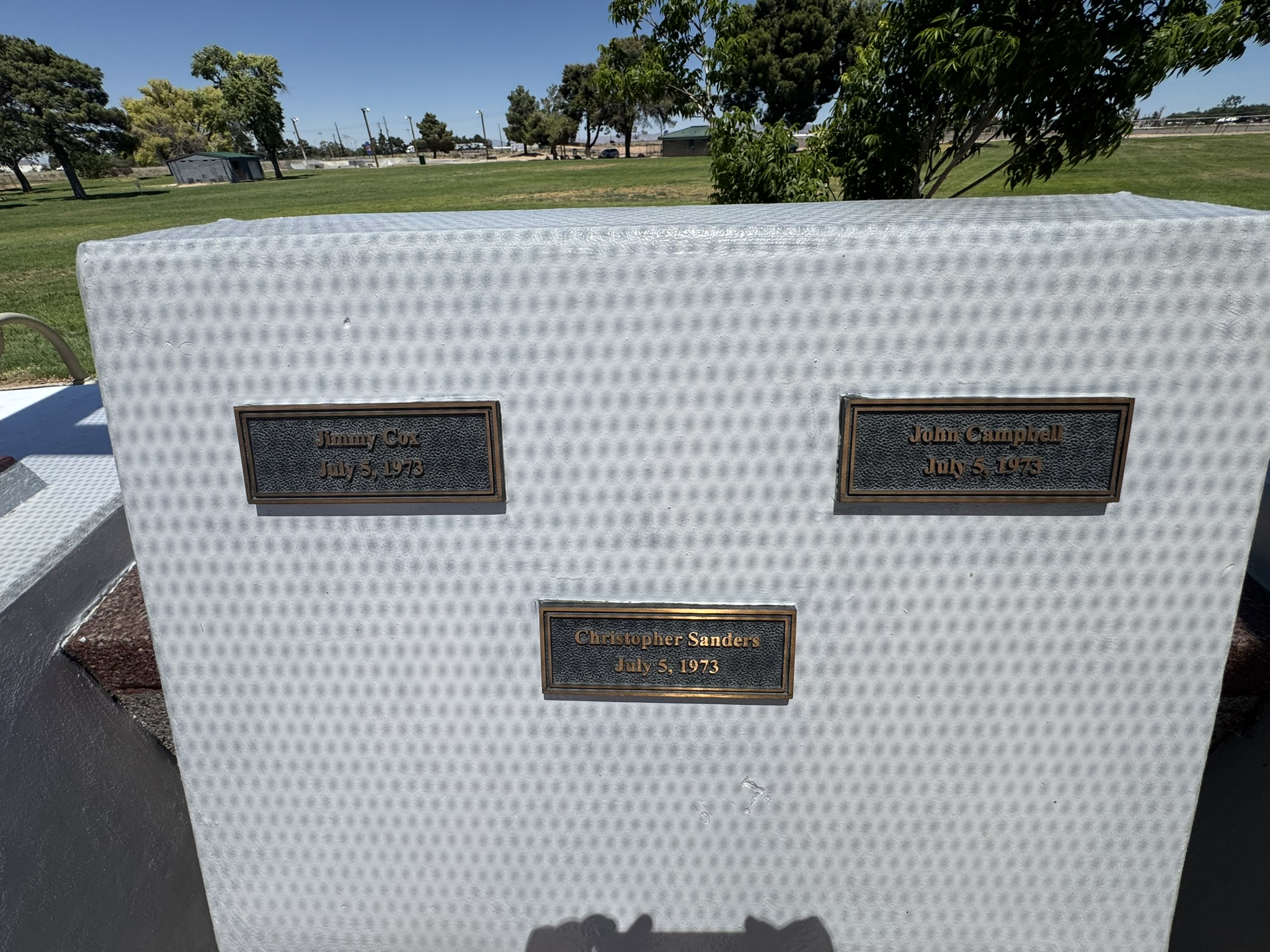
