= Stewardship End Result Contracting =

Stewardship end result contracting is an approach to national forest management wherein timber sales can be expanded to require purchasers to perform additional silvicultural activities. Such goods-for-services contracts have been authorized by Congress on a limited basis in several of the annual Department of the Interior and Related Agencies Appropriations Acts. (Although part of the U.S. Department of Agriculture, the U.S. Forest Service has been funded in these Acts since the 1950s.).

== See also ==
Stewardship Contracting Reauthorization and Improvement Act
