= HD 69830 c =

Neptunian-sized planet orbiting HD 69830

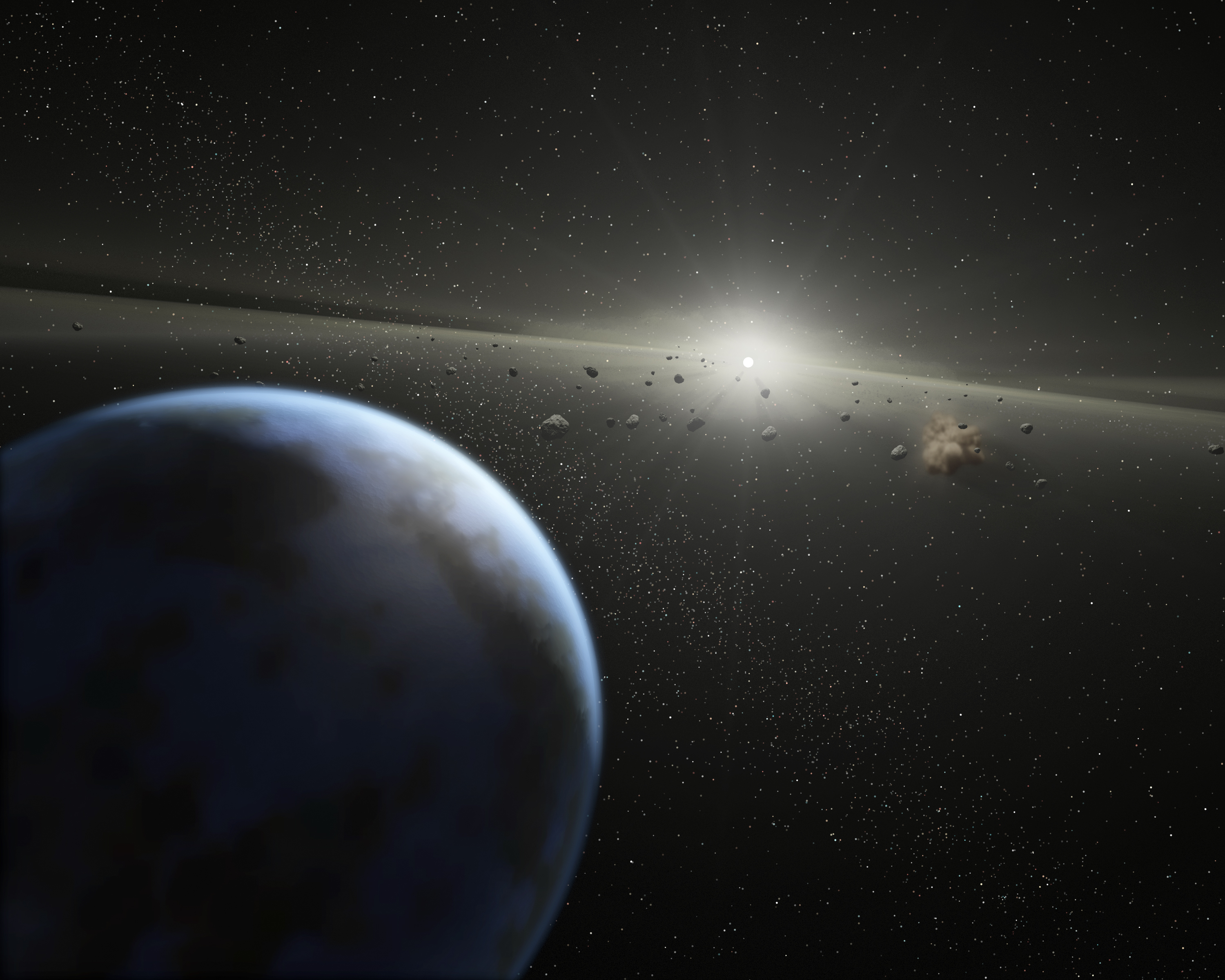
- HD 69830 c

Discovery
- Discovered by: C. Lovis et al.
- Discovery date: May 18, 2006
- Detection method: Radial velocity

Orbital characteristics
- Semi-major axis: 0.181 ± 0.004 AU (27,080,000 ± 600,000 km)
- Eccentricity: 0.03±0.027
- Orbital period (sidereal): 31.6158±0.0051 d
- Time of periastron: 2,453,469.6 ± 2.8
- Argument of periastron: 221 ± 35
- Semi-amplitude: 2.6±0.1 m/s
- Star: HD 69830

Physical characteristics
- Mass: ≥12.09+0.55 −0.54 M_{🜨}
- Temperature: ~522 K

HD 69830 c is an exoplanet candidate orbiting HD 69830. It was discovered in 2006 by the radial velocity method. It is the second-closest planet in its system and has a minimum mass 12 times that of Earth. Based on theoretical modeling in the 2006 discovery paper, it is likely to be a rocky planet, not a gas giant. However, other work has found that if it had formed as a gas giant, it would have stayed that way, and it is now understood that planets this massive are rarely rocky.

HD 69830 c's existence was disputed in 2026 as the host star's radial velocity variations were found to be likely correlated with stellar activity indicators, instead of the planet's gravitational pull.
