= HD 60532 =

Star in the constellation Puppis

- Location of HD 60532 (circled in red)

Observation data Epoch J2000.0 Equinox J2000.0
- Constellation: Puppis
- Right ascension: 07^{h} 34^{m} 03.181^{s}
- Declination: −22° 17′ 45.84″
- Apparent magnitude (V): 4.450

Characteristics
- Evolutionary stage: subgiant
- Spectral type: F6 IV-V
- U−B color index: +0.07
- B−V color index: +0.51

Astrometry
Radial velocity (R_{v})	+61.042±0.0004 km/s
Proper motion (μ)	RA: −40.180 mas/yr Dec.: +46.791 mas/yr
Parallax (π)	38.1379±0.1087 mas
Distance	85.5 ± 0.2 ly (26.22 ± 0.07 pc)
Absolute magnitude (M_{V})	+2.42

Details
Mass	1.44^{+0.03}_{−0.1} M_{☉}
Radius	2.66±0.03 R_{☉}
Luminosity	9.3±0.1 L_{☉}
Surface gravity (log g)	3.75±0.02 cgs
Temperature	6,095 K
Metallicity [Fe/H]	−0.42 dex
Rotational velocity (v sin i)	8 km/s
Age	2.7±0.1 Gyr

Other designations
- 108 G. Puppis, BD−21°2007, GC 10134, GJ 279, HIP 36795, HR 2906, SAO 174009, 2MASS J07340317-2217457

Database references
SIMBAD	data
Exoplanet Archive	data
ARICNS	data

HD 60532, also known as Gliese 279, is a star with two orbiting exoplanets in the southern constellation of Puppis. The designation HD 60532 takes its name from the Henry Draper Catalogue. It is #279 in the Gliese Catalogue of Nearby Stars. The system is located at a distance of 85.5 light years from the Sun, and is drifting further away with a radial velocity of 61 km/s. At that distance, the star has an apparent visual magnitude of 4.45, which is bright enough to be faintly visible to the naked eye. The motion of this system through space brought it within 10.3 light-years of the Sun some 408,600 years ago.

== Properties ==
The spectrum of this star shows blended features of an F-type main-sequence star and an evolving subgiant star, with a corresponding stellar classification of F6 IV-V. It is an estimated 2.7 billion years old with a projected rotational velocity of 8 km/s and a low level of magnetic activity in its chromosphere. The star has 1.44 times the mass of the Sun and 2.66 times the Sun's radius. The abundance of iron, a measure of the star's metallicity, is 38% that of the Sun. HD 60532 is radiating 9.3 times the luminosity of the Sun from its photosphere at an effective temperature of 6,095 K.

== Planetary system ==
In September 2008, two Jupiter-like planets, components b and c, were found orbiting the star, by Desort et al at the La Silla Observatory. The orbital periods of these two planets appear to be in 3:1 resonance. However, their inclination is still unknown and therefore their radii cannot be calculated.

The HD 60532 planetary system
Companion (in order from star)	Mass	Semimajor axis (AU)	Orbital period (days)	Eccentricity	Inclination (°)	Radius
b	≥1.06±0.08 M_{J}	0.77±0.02	201.9±0.3	0.26±0.02	—	—
c	≥2.51±0.16 M_{J}	1.60±0.04	600.1±2.4	0.03±0.02	—	—

== See also ==
- HD 69830
- List of extrasolar planets
