= HD 69830 b =

Neptunian-sized exoplanet orbiting HD 69830

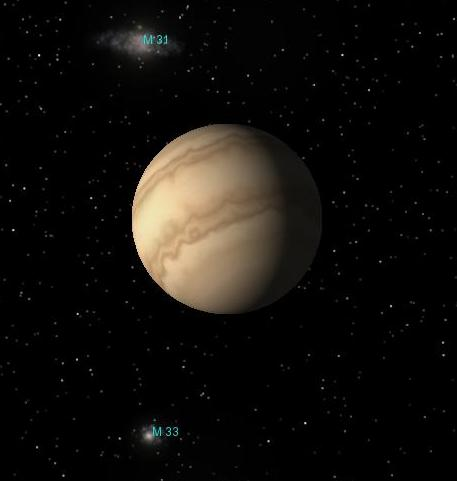

Discovery
- Discovered by: C. Lovis et al.
- Discovery date: May 18, 2006
- Detection method: Radial velocity

Orbital characteristics
- Semi-major axis: 0.0764 ± 0.0017 AU (11,430,000 ± 250,000 km)
- Eccentricity: 0.128±0.028
- Orbital period (sidereal): 8.66897±0.00028 d
- Time of periastron: 2,453,496.8 ± 0.06
- Argument of periastron: 340 ± 26
- Semi-amplitude: 3.4±0.1 m/s
- Star: HD 69830

Physical characteristics
- Mass: ≥10.1+0.38 −0.37 M_{🜨}
- Temperature: ~804 K

HD 69830 b is a Neptune-mass or super-Earth-mass exoplanet orbiting the star HD 69830. It is at least 10 times more massive than Earth. It also orbits very close to its parent star and takes 8^{2}/_{3} days to complete an orbit.

Based on theoretical modeling in the 2006 discovery paper, this is likely to be a rocky planet, not a gas giant. However, other work has found that if it had formed as a gas giant, it would have stayed that way, and it is now understood that planets this massive are rarely rocky.

If HD 69830 b is a terrestrial planet, models predict that tidal heating would produce a heat flux at the surface of about 55 W/m^{2}. This is 20 times that of Io.
