= HD 60532 c =

Extrasolar planet in the constellation Puppis

Discovery
- Discovered by: Desort et al.
- Discovery site: La Silla Observatory
- Discovery date: September 22, 2008
- Detection method: Doppler spectroscopy

Orbital characteristics
- Apastron: 1.64 AU (245,000,000 km)
- Periastron: 1.52 AU (227,000,000 km)
- Semi-major axis: 1.58 AU (236,000,000 km)
- Eccentricity: 0.038 ± 0.008
- Orbital period (sidereal): 607.06 ± 2.1 d 1.6620 y
- Inclination: ~20
- Time of periastron: 2454000
- Argument of periastron: 119.49 ± 9.14
- Star: HD 60532

Physical characteristics
- Mass: 7.46 M_{J}

HD 60532 c is an extrasolar planet located approximately 84 light-years away in the constellation of Puppis, orbiting the star HD 60532. This planet has a true mass of 7.46 times more than Jupiter, orbits at 1.58 AU, and takes 607 days to revolve in an eccentric orbit. This planet was discovered on September 22, 2008 in La Silla Observatory using the HARPS spectrograph. On this same day, the second planet in this system, HD 60532 b, was discovered in a 3:1 orbital resonance.
