= Granite Mountain Hotshots Memorial State Park =

State park in Arizona, United States

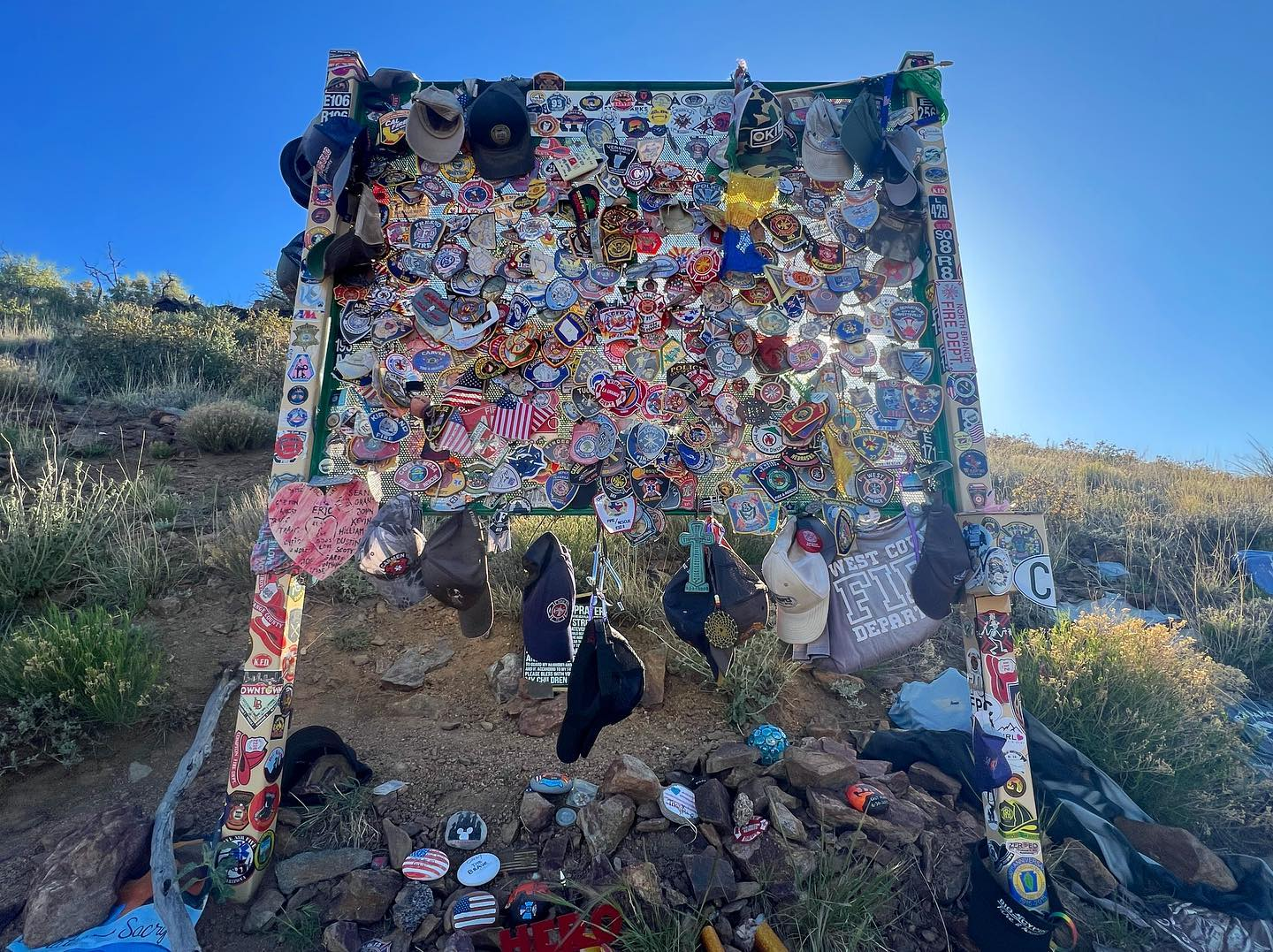
- Memorial signpost near the fatality site

- Location within Arizona Location within the United States
- Location: Yavapai County, Arizona, United States
- Coordinates: 34°12′47″N 112°46′37″W
- Area: 320 acres (130 ha)
- Elevation: 4,318 ft (1,316 m)
- Established: 2016
- Administrator: Arizona State Parks & Trails, U.S. Forest Service
- Visitors: 14,048 (in 2024)
- Website: Official website

Granite Mountain Hotshots Memorial State Park is a state park near Yarnell, Arizona, created to memorialize the nineteen members of the Granite Mountain Hotshots who died there on June 30, 2013, while fighting the Yarnell Hill Fire.

The park opened on November 30, 2016, and had over 18,000 visitors in its first year. The park, located at the site where the firefighters died, is accessed by a 3.5-mile (5.6 km) hiking trail from the parking area off Arizona State Route 89. The park entrance and trailhead is about 2 miles (3.2 km) south of Yarnell.

== History ==
The park was authorized by House Bill 2624 introduced into the Arizona House of Representatives on February 11, 2014, and signed into law by Governor Jan Brewer on April 30, 2014. Planning by the Yarnell Hill Memorial Site Board began in late November. By April 2015, the board decided to purchase the land for the park. The purchase of 320 acres (130 ha) of Arizona State Trust Land for the park occurred on June 30, 2015, at which time the park received its official name. Planning for the trail to reach the site began soon thereafter. Arizona Public Service donated $229,000 towards the construction of the trail.

In January 2016, workers from the American Conservation Experience began work on the main trail. Construction of a small parking lot at the trail head began in March, followed by the memorial gabion baskets. Most of the work was finished that summer, with "final placement of benches and interpretive signs" occurring in October and November. A dedication ceremony was held on November 29, 2016, led by Governor Doug Ducey and state senators Steve Pierce and Karen Fann. The park opened to the public the following day.

== Description ==
The memorial is made of 19 rock baskets or gabions connected by chains forming a circle around the fatality site. It is surrounded by a pathway and includes a flagpole. Along the trail to the site are 19 granite memorial plaques, each with a photo of a hotshot and a short biography. There are also memorial benches along the trail. The trail first reaches an observation deck 400 feet (120 m) above the memorial. The portion of the trail from the observation deck down to the memorial circle is 0.75 miles (1.21 km) and is named the Journey trail, a reference to the hotshots' final journey.

The memorial plaques are embedded into rock formations along the trail, one approximately every 600 feet (180 m) and are arranged in order of the seniority of the crew. The trail starts at an elevation of 4,318 feet (1,316 m) and climbs to 5,460 feet (1,660 m) at the observation deck. It is steep and rugged with over 200 steps carved into rock and several switchbacks.

== Hotshot crew ==
Granite Mountain Hotshots
(seniority order, as memorial plaques are
encountered along the trail)
- Eric Marsh, 43
- Jesse Steed, 36
- Clayton Whitted, 28
- Robert Caldwell, 23
- Travis Carter, 31
- Travis Turbyfill, 27
- Christopher MacKenzie, 30
- Andrew Ashcraft, 29
- Joe Thurston, 32
- Wade Parker, 22
- Anthony Rose, 23
- Garret Zuppiger, 27
- Scott Norris, 28
- Dustin Deford, 24
- William Warneke, 25
- Kevin Woyjeck, 21
- John Percin, 24
- Grant McKee, 21
- Sean Misner, 26

== See also ==
- List of Arizona state parks
