= HD 69830 d =

Ice giant exoplanet orbiting HD 69830

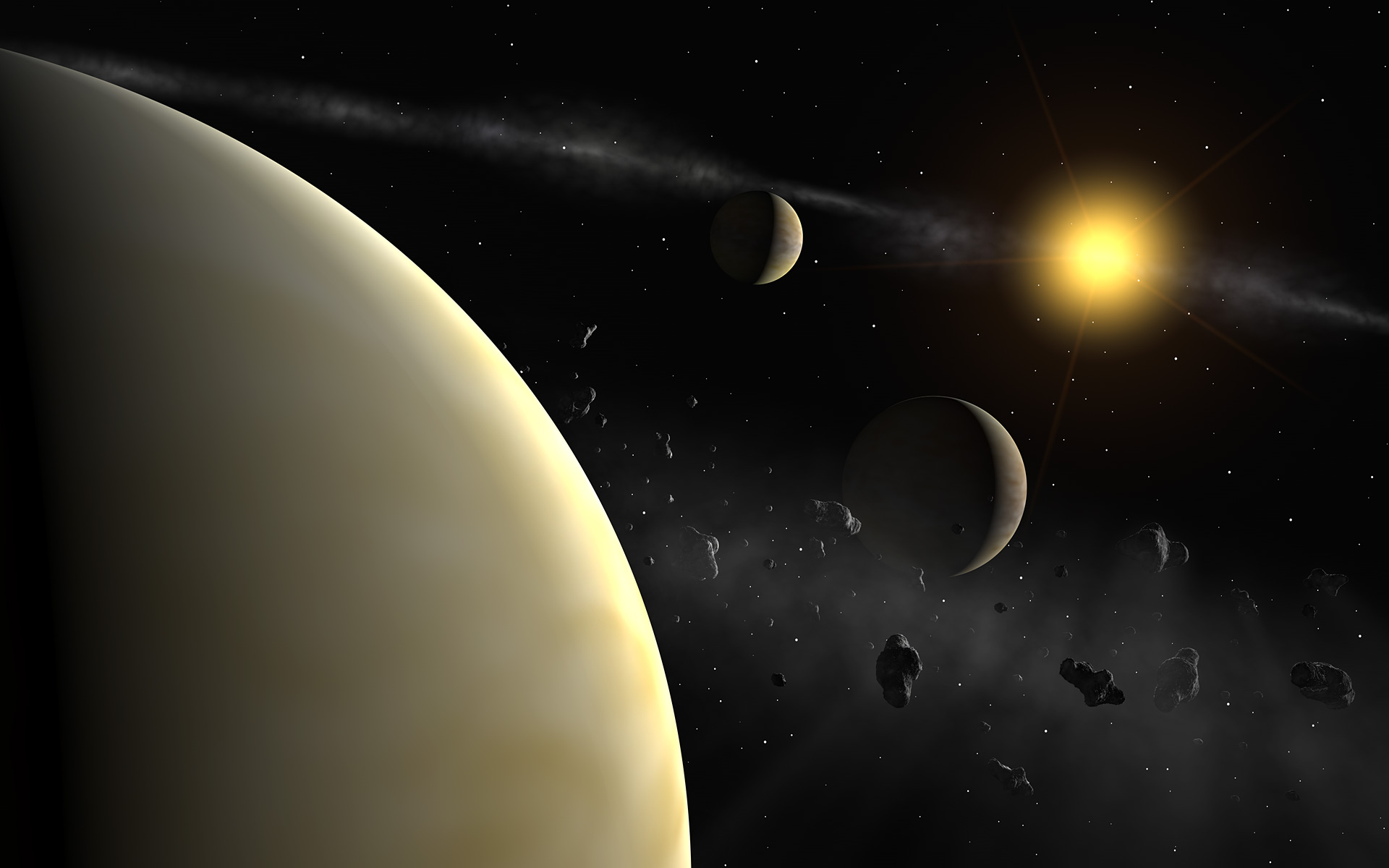
- Artist's impression of the HD 69830 system as viewed from planet "d" (foreground).

Discovery
- Discovered by: C. Lovis et al.
- Discovery date: May 18, 2006
- Detection method: Radial velocity

Orbital characteristics
- Semi-major axis: 0.622 ± 0.014 AU (93,000,000 ± 2,100,000 km)
- Eccentricity: 0.080±0.071
- Orbital period (sidereal): 201.4±0.4 d
- Time of periastron: 24513358 ± 34
- Argument of periastron: 224 ± 61
- Semi-amplitude: 2.20 ± 0.19
- Star: HD 69830

Physical characteristics
- Mean radius: ~4 R_{🜨}
- Mass: ≥ 12.26+0.89 −0.88 M_{🜨}
- Temperature: 284 K (11 °C; 52 °F)

HD 69830 d is an exoplanet likely orbiting within the habitable zone of the star HD 69830, the outermost of three such planets discovered in the system. It is located approximately 40.7 light-years (12.49 parsecs, or 3.8505×10^{14} km) from Earth in the constellation of Puppis. The exoplanet was found by using the radial velocity method, from radial-velocity measurements via observation of Doppler shifts in the spectrum of the planet's parent star.

== Characteristics ==
=== Mass, radius and temperature ===
HD 69830 d is a Neptune-sized planet with a minimum mass of at least 12 M_{🜨}, and an estimated temperature of 284 K (11 °C; 52 °F).

=== Host star ===
The planet orbits a G-type star named HD 69830, orbited by total of three planets, of which HD 69830 d has the longest orbital period. The star has a mass of 0.86 M_{☉} and a radius of 0.90 R_{☉}. It has a surface temperature of 5394 K and is 10.6 billion years old. In comparison, the Sun is 4.6 billion years old and has a surface temperature of 5778 K.

The star's apparent magnitude, or how bright it appears from Earth's perspective, is 5.47. Therefore, HD 69830 is visible to the naked eye.

=== Orbit ===
The planet's orbit has a low orbital eccentricity, like most of the planets in the Solar System. The semimajor axis of the orbit is only 0.62 AU, similar to that of Venus. However, its star is less massive and energetic than the Sun (with a luminosity of 0.62 L_{☉}), thereby putting the planet within its habitable zone.

== Habitability ==
HD 69830 d likely resides in the habitable zone of its parent star. The exoplanet, with an estimated mass of 17 M_{🜨}, is too massive to likely be rocky, and because of this the planet itself is not habitable. Hypothetically, large enough moons, with a sufficient atmosphere and pressure, may be able to support liquid water and potentially life.

For a stable orbit the ratio between the moon's orbital period P_{s} around its primary and that of the primary around its star P_{p} must be < 1/9, e.g. if a planet takes 90 days to orbit its star, the maximum stable orbit for a moon of that planet is less than 10 days. Simulations suggest that a moon with an orbital period less than about 45 to 60 days will remain safely bound to a massive giant planet or brown dwarf that orbits 1 AU from a Sun-like star. In the case of HD 69830 d, this would be around 22 days in order to have a stable orbit.

Tidal effects could also allow the moon to sustain plate tectonics, which would cause volcanic activity to regulate the moon's temperature and create a geodynamo effect which would give the satellite a strong magnetic field.

To support an Earth-like atmosphere for about 4.6 billion years (the age of the Earth), the moon would have to have a Mars-like density and at least a mass of 0.07 M_{🜨}. One way to decrease loss from sputtering is for the moon to have a strong magnetic field that can deflect stellar wind and radiation belts. NASA's Galileo's measurements hints large moons can have magnetic fields; it found that Jupiter's moon Ganymede has its own magnetosphere, even though its mass is only 0.025 M_{🜨}.

== Discovery ==
HD 69830 d was discovered in 2006 with the HARPS echelle spectrograph installed on the European Southern Observatory 3.6-meter telescope at La Silla Observatory, Chile.

== In popular culture ==
In the Halo video game series, Eayn, a fictional moon of HD 69830 d, is the homeworld of the Kig-Yar species, a member of the enemy Covenant. The planet was known to them as Chu’ot.

== See also ==
- Sudarsky exoplanet classification
