= HD 69830 =

G-type star in the constellation Puppis

- Location of HD 69830 (circled in red)

Observation data Epoch J2000 Equinox ICRS
- Constellation: Puppis
- Right ascension: 08^{h} 18^{m} 23.94697^{s}
- Declination: −12° 37′ 55.8172″
- Apparent magnitude (V): +5.98

Characteristics
- Evolutionary stage: main sequence
- Spectral type: G8V
- U−B color index: 0.33
- B−V color index: 0.75

Astrometry
Radial velocity (R_{v})	30.09±0.12 km/s
Proper motion (μ)	RA: +278.790 mas/yr Dec.: −987.829 mas/yr
Parallax (π)	79.4953±0.0400 mas
Distance	41.03 ± 0.02 ly (12.579 ± 0.006 pc)
Absolute magnitude (M_{V})	+5.47±0.01

Details
Mass	0.88±0.01 M_{☉}
Radius	0.912±0.019 R_{☉}
Luminosity	0.598±0.008 L_{☉}
Surface gravity (log g)	4.410±0.017 cgs
Temperature	5,399±5 K
Metallicity [Fe/H]	−0.029±0.006 dex
Rotation	35.1±0.8 days
Rotational velocity (v sin i)	0.8±0.5 km/s
Age	8.30+0.73 −0.29 Gyr

Other designations
- 285 G. Puppis, BD−12°2449, GJ 302, HIP 40693, HR 3259, LHS 245, SAO 154093, 2MASS J08182389-1237541, Gaia DR2 5726982995343100928

Database references
SIMBAD	data
Exoplanet Archive	data
ARICNS	data

HD 69830 (285 G. Puppis) is a yellow dwarf star located 41.0 light-years (12.6 parsecs) away in the constellation of Puppis. In 2005, the Spitzer Space Telescope discovered a narrow ring of warm debris orbiting the star. The debris ring contains substantially more dust than the Solar System's asteroid belt. In 2006, three extrasolar planets with minimum masses comparable to Neptune were confirmed in orbit around the star, located interior to the debris ring.

== Distance and visibility ==
HD 69830 is a main sequence star of spectral type G8V. It has about 88% of the Sun's mass, 91.2% of its radius, 59.8% of its luminosity, and 93.5% of its iron abundance. The star's age has been estimated at 8.3 billion years. HD 69830 is located about 40.7 light-years from the Sun, lying in the northeastern part of the constellation of Puppis (the Poop Deck). It can be seen east of Sirius, southwest of Procyon, northeast of Delta Canis Majoris, and north of Zeta Puppis.

== Planetary system ==
The HD 69830 planetary system
Companion (in order from star)	Mass	Semimajor axis (AU)	Orbital period (days)	Eccentricity	Inclination (°)	Radius
b	≥10.1+0.38 −0.37 M_{🜨}	0.0764±0.0017	8.66897±0.00028	0.128±0.028	—	—
c (disputed)	≥12.09+0.55 −0.54 M_{🜨}	0.181±0.004	31.6158±0.0051	0.03±0.027	—	—
d	≥12.26+0.89 −0.88 M_{🜨}	0.622±0.014	201.4±0.4	0.08±0.071	—	—
Asteroid belt	0.93–1.16 AU				—	—

=== Planets ===
On May 17, 2006, a team of astronomers using the European Southern Observatory's (ESO) HARPS spectrograph on the 3.6-metre La Silla telescope in the Atacama Desert, Chile, announced the discovery of three extrasolar planets orbiting the star. With minimum masses between 10 and 18 times that of the Earth, all three planets are presumed to be similar to the planets Neptune or Uranus. A 2026 study, however, found that the radial velocity signal of planet c is likely correlated with stellar activity indicators, suggesting that the planet might not exist.

The star rotates at an inclination of 13^{+27}_{−13} degrees relative to Earth. It has been assumed that the planets share that inclination. However b and c are "hot Neptunes", and outside this system several are now known to be oblique relative to the stellar axis.

The outermost planet discovered appears to be within the system's habitable zone, where liquid water would remain stable (more accurate data on the primary star's luminosity will be required to know for sure where the habitable zone is). HD 69830 is the first extrasolar planetary system around a Sun-like star without any known planets comparable to Jupiter or Saturn in mass.

The planetary parameters were updated in 2023.

=== Debris disk ===
In 2005, the Spitzer Space Telescope detected a debris disk in the HD 69830 system consistent with being produced by an asteroid belt twenty times more massive than that in our own system. The belt was originally thought to be located inside an orbit equivalent to that of Venus in the Solar System, which would place it between the orbits of the second and third planets. The disk contains sufficient quantities of dust that the nights on any nearby planets would be lit up by zodiacal light 1,000 times brighter than that seen on Earth, easily outshining the Milky Way.

Further analysis of the spectrum of the dust in 2007 revealed that it is composed of highly processed material, likely derived from a disrupted rocky asteroid of at least 30 km radius which contained many small olivine-rich (rocky) and once-wet grains which would not survive at close distances to the star. Instead, it seems more likely that the asteroid belt producing the dust is located outside the orbit of the outermost planet, around 1 AU from the star. This region contains the 2:1 and 5:2 mean motion resonances with HD 69830 d.

== Gallery ==
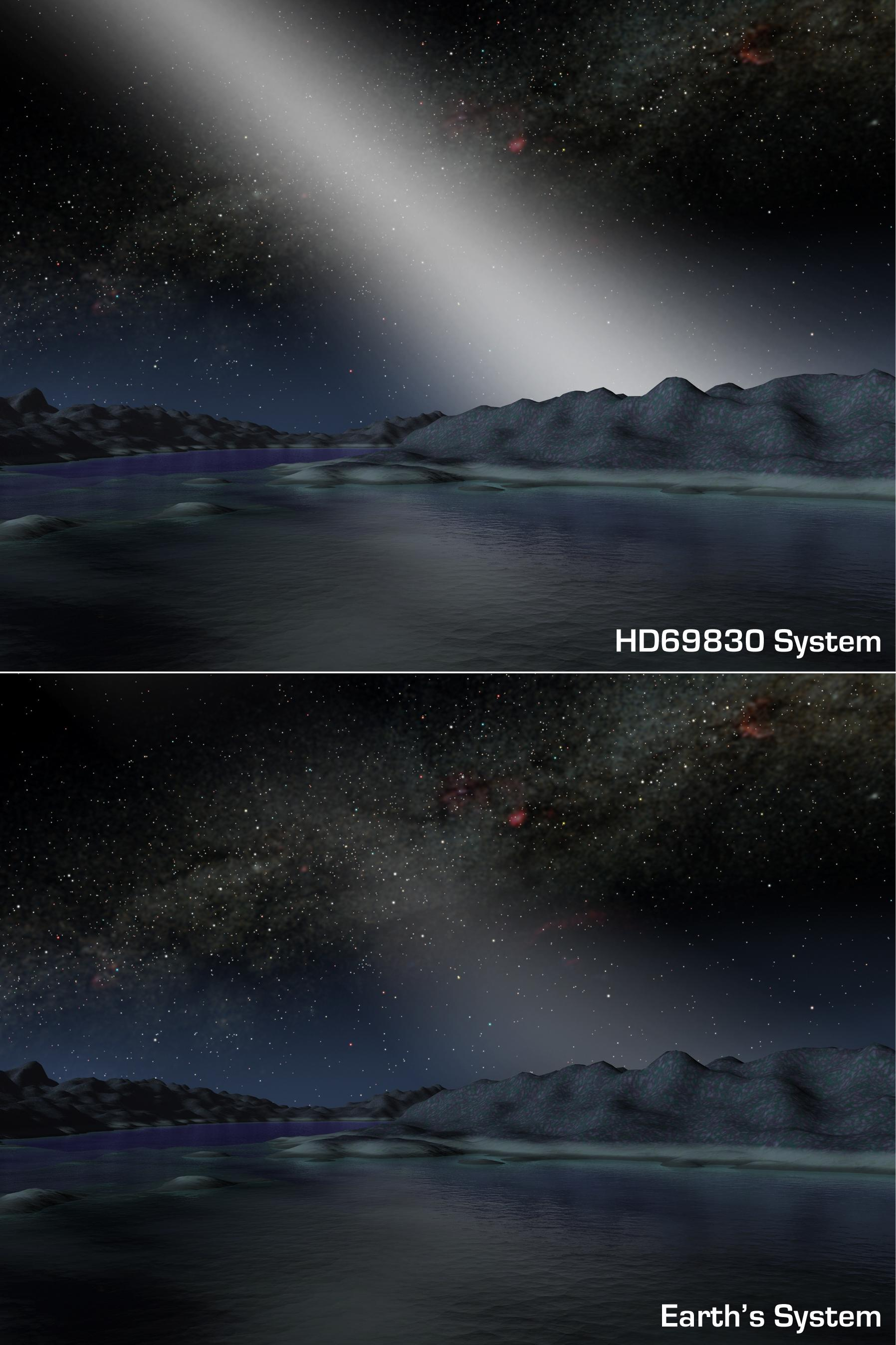
A comparison between the night sky of Earth and a planet of HD 69830

The orbits of the planets of HD 69830 and the debris disk

== See also ==
- HD 169830
- HD 40307
- HD 60532
- List of star systems within 40–45 light-years
