= Yarnell Hill Fire =

2013 wildfire in Arizona, USA

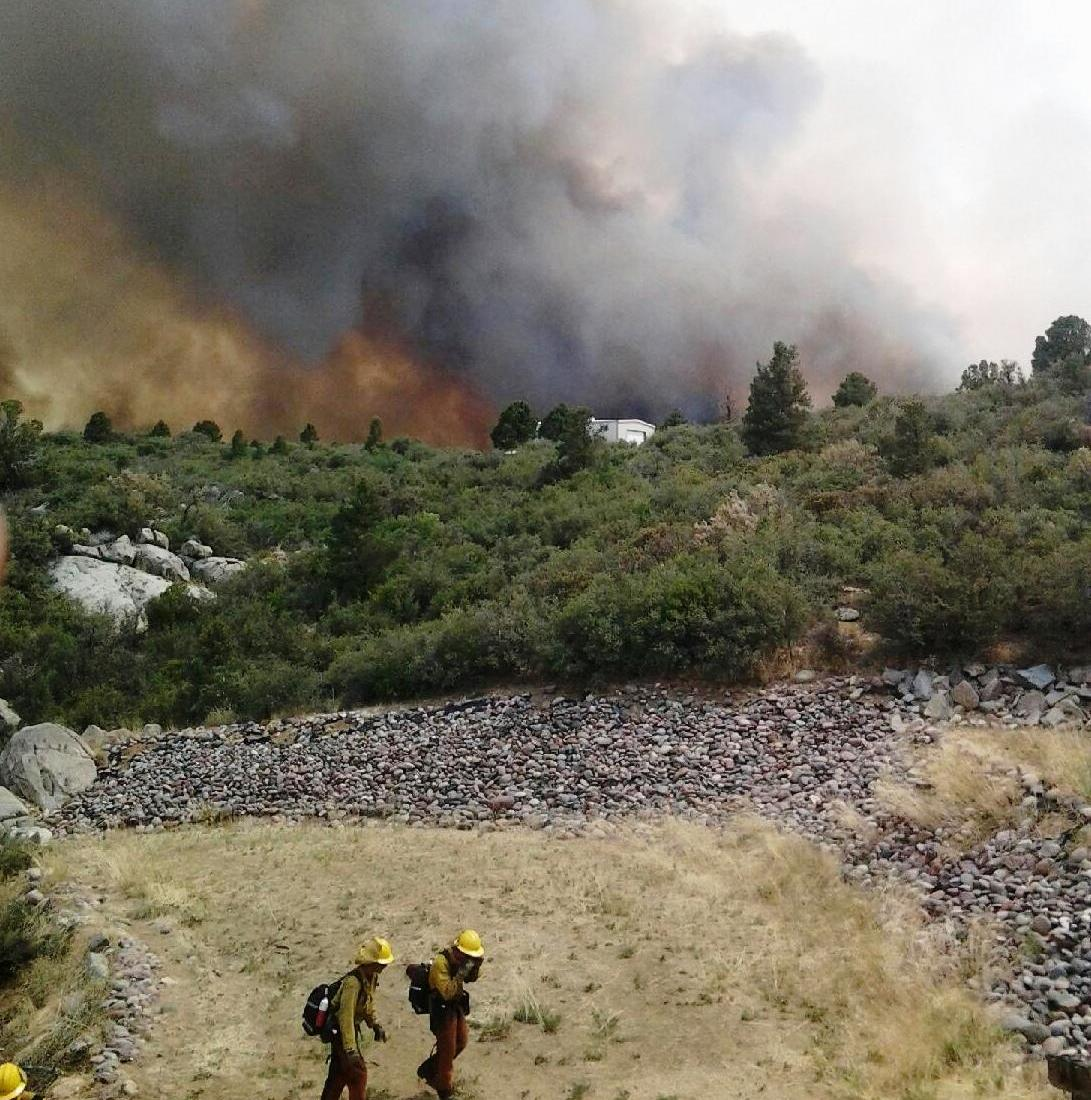
- The fire on July 1, 2013
- Date: June 28 – July 10, 2013
- Location: Yavapai County, Arizona, U.S.
- Coordinates: 34°13′13″N 112°46′41″W

Statistics
- Burned area: 8,400 acres (34 km^{2})

Impacts
- Deaths: 19
- Injuries: 23
- Structures destroyed: 129
- Cost: $900 million

Ignition
- Cause: Dry lightning

Map
- Location within Arizona Location within the United States

A wildfire near Yarnell, Arizona–ignited by dry lightning on June 28, 2013–overran and killed 19 members of the Granite Mountain Hotshots, a group of firefighters within the Prescott Fire Department, on June 30. Just one of the hotshots on the crew survived (Brendan McDonough) — he was posted as a lookout on the fire and was not with the others when the fire overtook them. The Yarnell Hill Fire was one of the deadliest U.S. wildfires since the 1991 Oakland Hills fire, which killed 25 people, and the deadliest wildland fire for U.S. firefighters since the 1933 Griffith Park fire, which killed 29 "impromptu" civilian firefighters drafted on short notice to help battle the Los Angeles area fire.

Yarnell also killed more firefighters than any incident since the September 11 attacks. The Yarnell Hill Fire is the sixth-deadliest American firefighter disaster in history, the deadliest wildfire ever in the state of Arizona, and (at least until 2014) was "the most-publicized event in wildland firefighting history".

The tragedy is primarily attributed to an extreme and sudden shift in weather patterns, causing the fire to intensify and cut off the firefighters' route as they were escaping. The victims were killed by the intense heat and flames of the fire. Other factors that contributed to the tragedy include the terrain surrounding the escape route, which may have blocked the victims' view of the fire front and limited situational awareness, and problems with radio communications.

== Overview ==
At around 5:36 p.m. MST (23:36 UTC) on June 28, 2013, a spell of dry lightning ignited a wildfire on Bureau of Land Management lands near Yarnell, Arizona, a town of approximately 700 residents located about 80 miles (130 km) northwest of Phoenix. On June 30, winds blowing at over 22 mph (35 km/h) pushed the fire from 300 acres (120 ha) to over 2,000 acres (810 ha). A long-term drought affecting the area contributed to the fire's rapid spread and erratic behavior, as did temperatures of 101 °F (38 °C).

By July 1, the fire had expanded to over 8,300 acres (3,400 ha) and prompted the evacuation of the nearby community of Peeples Valley. The fire was still completely uncontrolled, with more than 400 firefighters on the line. On July 2, the fire was estimated at 8% containment and had not grown in the past 24 hours. By the end of the day on July 3, the fire was reportedly 45 percent contained and showing no signs of expanding, thus allowing Peeples Valley residents to return to their homes on July 4. Four days later, on July 8, Yarnell residents were permitted to return. The fire was declared 100% contained on July 10.

The Yavapai County Sheriff's Office said that 127 buildings in Yarnell and two in Peeples Valley had been destroyed. A "flash point" of the fire was the Glen Ilah neighborhood of Yarnell, where fewer than half of the structures were burned. Officials shut down 25 miles (40 km) of Arizona State Route 89 shortly after the fire started, and 15 miles (24 km) of State Route 89 remained closed as of June 30.

A total evacuation of Yarnell and partial evacuation of Peeples Valley was ordered. At least 600 people were under mandatory evacuation orders. An evacuation shelter was set up at Yavapai College in Prescott, with members of the Red Cross providing cots and blankets for overnight stays, along with meals and medical assistance.

A second evacuation shelter was assembled at Wickenburg High School in nearby Wickenburg, because the closure of State Route 89 made it impossible for some people to reach the first shelter. Officials from the Red Cross said that 351 people spent at least one night at one of the shelters.

== Fatalities ==
Fatalities

- Andrew Ashcraft, 29
- Robert Caldwell, 23
- Travis Carter, 31
- Dustin DeFord, 24
- Christopher MacKenzie, 30
- Eric Marsh, 43
- Grant McKee, 21
- Sean Misner, 26
- Scott Norris, 28
- Wade Parker, 22
- John Percin Jr., 24
- Anthony Rose, 23
- Jesse Steed, 36
- Joe Thurston, 33
- Travis Turbyfill, 27
- William Warneke, 26
- Clayton Whitted, 28
- Kevin Woyjeck, 21
- Garret Zuppiger, 27

On June 30, wildland firefighters with the Prescott Fire Department's interagency Granite Mountain Hotshots were overrun and killed by the fire. Initial reports indicated that one of the firefighters was not a member of the hotshot crew (IHC), but Prescott Fire Chief Dan Fraijo later confirmed that all 19 were Granite Mountain Hotshots. The firefighters had apparently deployed fire shelters during the entrapment, but the heat of the wildfire soared over 2,000 °F (1,090 °C). Not all of the bodies were found inside the fire shelters. The city of Prescott released the names of the 19 firefighters on July 1.

The only survivor from the 20-man crew was 21-year-old Brendan McDonough. He had been serving as a lookout when the fire threatened to overtake his position. McDonough contacted the Granite Mountain Hotshots' team by radio to let them know of his situation. He was told by the second in command, Jesse Steed, to evacuate his position. McDonough was hiking out on foot when he was located by Brian Frisby, superintendent of the Blue Ridge Hotshots, who was monitoring the radio communications between McDonough and the Granite Mountain IHC captain. Frisby and McDonough moved the crew's vehicles to a safer location, which they were doing at the time of the Granite Mountain crew's entrapment.

After moving the vehicles, Frisby and other members of the Blue Ridge Hotshots attempted to rescue the entrapped Granite Mountain Hotshots, but were forced back by the intense flames and heat of the fire. Driving through the streets of Yarnell, the Blue Ridge Hotshots evacuated several residents who had failed to evacuate earlier. At approximately 4:42 p.m., the fire overtook the Granite Mountain Hotshots' position. When a helicopter was able to fly into the area over two hours later, Eric Tarr, a police officer–paramedic with the Arizona Department of Public Safety went in on foot and found the 19 bodies.

According to the National Fire Protection Association, it was the greatest loss of life for firefighters in a wildfire since the 1933 Griffith Park fire, the greatest loss of firefighters in the United States since the destruction of the World Trade Center in 2001, and the deadliest wildfire of any kind since the 1991 East Bay Hills fire. The number of total fatalities—although not of firefighters—has since been surpassed by California's 2018 Camp fire which killed 85 civilians, and the 2023 Lahaina fire on Maui, Hawaiʻi, which killed 102 people.

=== Reactions ===
On June 30, Arizona Governor Jan Brewer issued a statement offering her condolences. "This is as dark a day as I can remember," she said. She ordered flags flown at half-staff in Arizona through July 19. President Barack Obama issued a statement on July 1, promising federal help and praising the 19 firefighters as heroes.

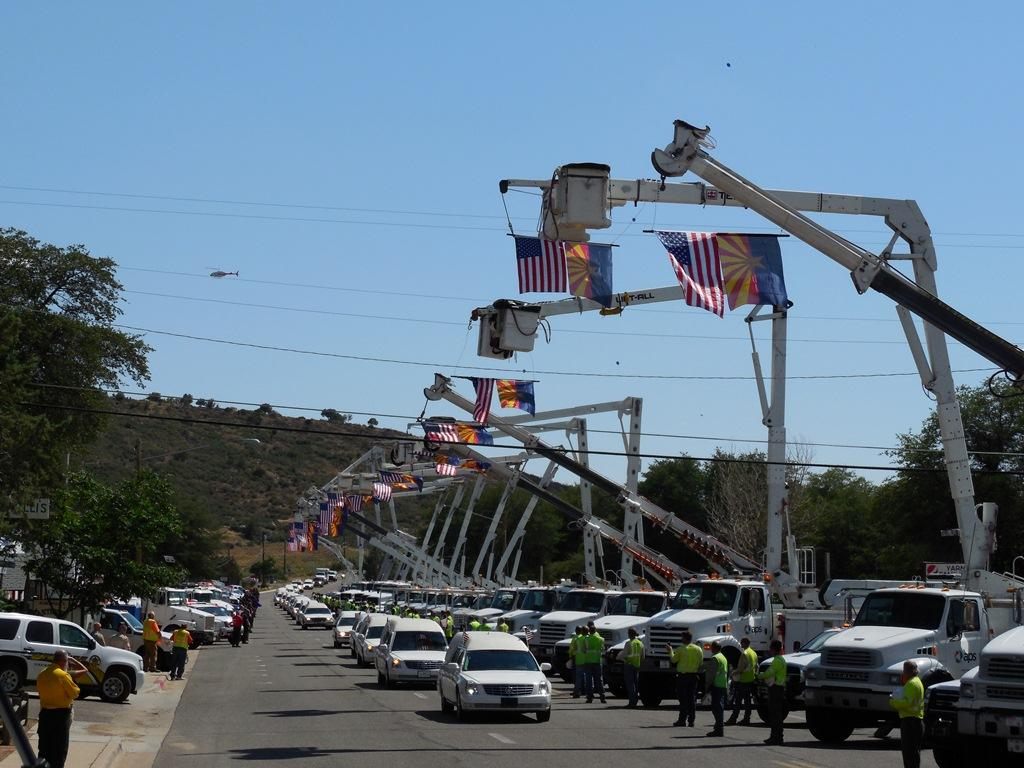
Funeral procession for the victims

Federal Emergency Management Agency Administrator Craig Fugate and United States Fire Administrator Ernest Mitchell issued similar statements on July 1. On July 2, members of the Arizona Cardinals visited one of the Red Cross shelters, and the team president donated US$100,000 to the 100 Club of Arizona, an organization that assists firefighters, police, and their families in crises. Authorities said that US$800,000 had been raised for the families of the victims as of July 4.

On July 2, more than 3,000 people attended a public memorial service at an indoor stadium in Prescott Valley. Vice President Joe Biden, Arizona Governor Jan Brewer, and the team's lone surviving firefighter, Brendan McDonough, spoke at a memorial in Prescott on Tuesday, July 9. That memorial was attended by thousands, including representatives from over 100 hotshot crews across the country, and was streamed live by several media outlets. Individual memorial services were scheduled for later in the hometowns of the 19 firefighters.

A nine-member investigative team of forest managers and safety experts arrived in Arizona on July 2. Their mission was to "understand what happened as completely as possible" to prevent similar incidents. Granite Mountain Hotshots Memorial State Park was created to honor the hotshots. A three-mile (4.8 km) path leads from a parking area on Highway 89 up to an observation deck. A trail follows the last steps of the hotshots down to the fatality site where they made their last stand. Encircling the fatality site, 19 gabions, one for each hotshot, are united by chains.

A second memorial has been placed at the intersection of Arizona State Route 89 and Hays Ranch Road in Peeples Valley. On March 3, 2019, the Arizona Hotshots of the Alliance of American Football retired the No. 19 jersey in honor of the fallen Granite Mountain Hotshots.

== Aftermath ==
On July 9, 2013, Governor Janice K. Brewer requested that FEMA declare the fire a major disaster, which would provide a wide range of federal assistance programs for individuals and households affected by the fire. On August 9, 2013, FEMA denied Governor Brewer's request. After Governor Brewer appealed FEMA's denial, FEMA issued a final denial of appeal on September 13, 2013. In their denial of appeal, FEMA said that the Governor's appeal was denied "based on the determination that the damage was not of such severity and magnitude as to be beyond the combined capabilities of the state, affected local governments, and voluntary agencies".

On July 7, 2013, joint federal, state, and local government damage assessments were conducted in the areas affected by the Yarnell Hill Fire. FEMA reported that 116 residences were impacted by the fire, including the destruction of 93 residences. Of the impacted residences, 38.3% were insured, and half were low income households.

Following a three-month investigation, the state's Forestry Division released a report and briefing video on September 28, 2013, which found no evidence of negligence nor recklessness in the deaths of the 19 firefighters and revealed that an airtanker carrying flame retardant was directly overhead as the firefighters died. The investigation did find some problems with radio communications due to heavy radio traffic and the fact that some radios were not programmed with appropriate tone guards.

On December 4, 2013, the Industrial Commission of Arizona, which oversees workplace safety, blamed the state's Forestry Division for the deaths of the 19 firefighters, based on an investigation by the state's Division of Occupational Safety and Health. The Commission said that state fire officials knowingly put protection of property ahead of safety and should have pulled crews out earlier. The commission levied a $559,000 fine.

Richard Brody, writing in The New Yorker, and Fernanda Santos, in The New York Times, point out numerous cases of firefighters' and their survivors' benefits having been withheld, lawsuits, and acrimony among the local politicians, some citizens, and the survivors of the firefighters who died in the Yarnell Hill Fire that became so extreme that, as Santos observes: "Juliann Ashcraft (wife of Granite Mountain Hotshot Andrew Ashcraft) decided to leave Prescott altogether to spare her four children the discomfort of whispers and glares." Brody further highlights "battles that the Hotshots' widows have faced over health insurance, taxes, labor law, and budgets, involving the online harassment of women".

In 2015, the autopsy and toxicology reports of all 19 fallen Granite Mountain Hotshots were publicly released.

=== In media ===
Outside magazine released the documentary film, The Granite Mountain Hotshots and the Yarnell Hill Fire (August 12, 2013), in which friends, relatives, and colleagues (including Brendan McDonough, the lone survivor of the Granite Mountain Hotshots) speak out.

The U.S. Forest Service released a series of videos on November 10, 2014, that were shot by wildland firefighters on the day of the Yarnell Hill tragedy. The Forest Service website notes: "To be transparent with the public, the videos are presented exactly as they have been received. The redactions were done before these videos came into the possession of Arizona State Forestry." In its coverage of these videos, Outside magazine posted an article and video excerpts.

The Weather Channel released a documentary, America Burning: The Yarnell Hill Fire Tragedy and the Nation's Wildfire Crisis (2014). Kyle Dickman, a former firefighter and former editor of Outside magazine, published the nonfiction book, On the Burning Edge: A Fateful Fire and the Men Who Fought It (2015). Brendan McDonough published his first-hand account, My Lost Brothers: The Untold Story by the Yarnell Hill Fire's Lone Survivor (May 3, 2016).

On October 20, 2017, Columbia Pictures released a biographical drama film based on the events of this disaster, titled Only the Brave. The film was praised for its acting and emotional portrayal of its subject matter.
