= 1933 Griffith Park fire =

1933 wildfire in Southern California

Griffith Park Fire
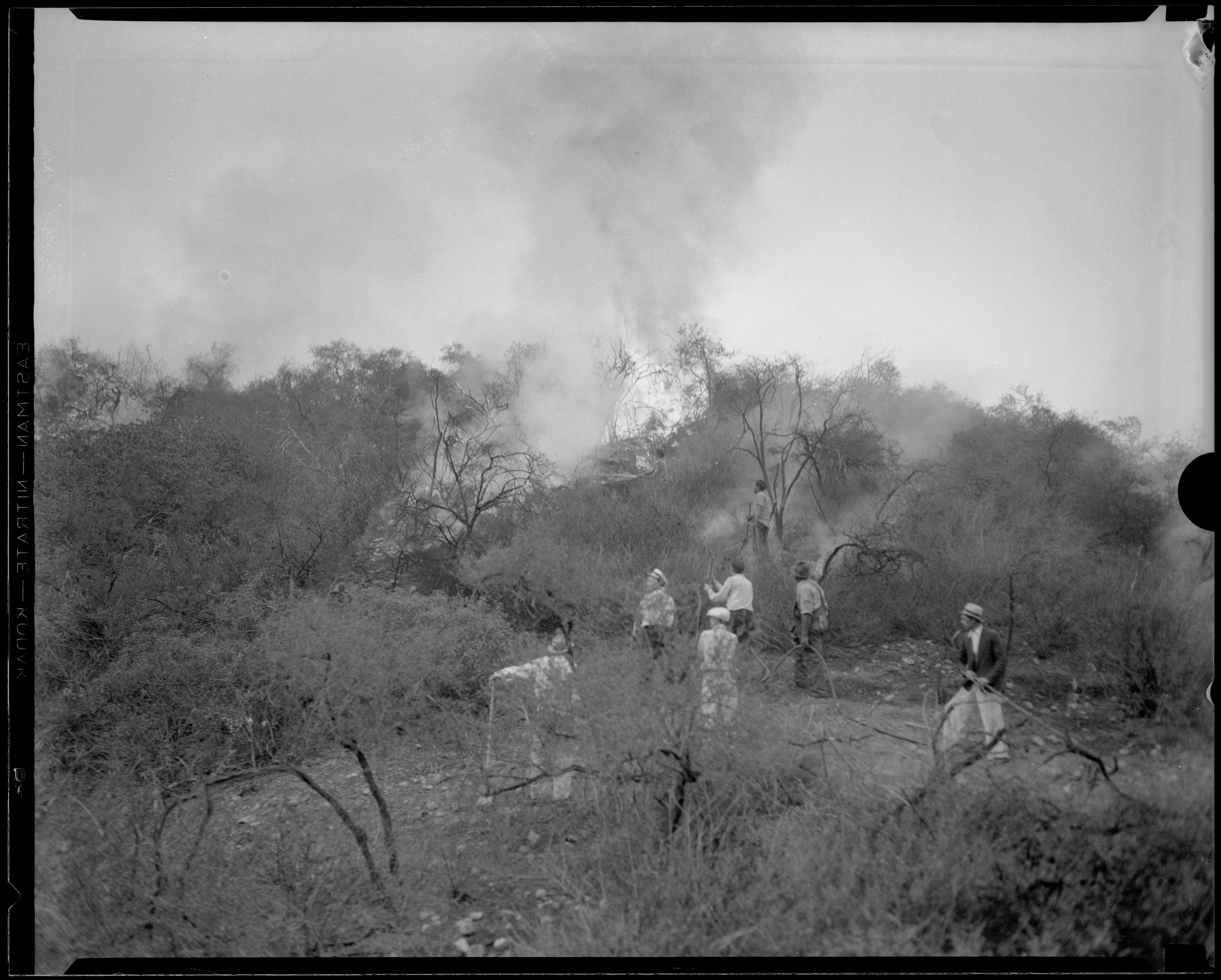
- Workers fighting the fire atop a hill in the park
- Date: October 3, 1933 –; October 4, 1933; (2 days)
- Location: Griffith Park, Los Angeles, California
- Coordinates: 34°8′32.66″N 118°17′36.28″W

Statistics
- Burned area: 47 acres (19 ha)

Impacts
- Deaths: 29
- Injuries: 150+

Map
- Location of fire in Los Angeles 1933 Griffith Park fire (California) 1933 Griffith Park fire (the United States)

A brush fire occurred on October 3, 1933, in Griffith Park in Los Angeles, resulting in the deaths of at least 29 civilians who were trying to fight the fire.

== Background ==
During the dry summer and fall of 1933, thousands of workers financed by the Reconstruction Finance Corporation were hired to clear dry brush and to build trails and roads in Griffith Park. On the day of the fire, one source gives an estimate of 3,780 men working in the park, for a pay of 40 cents per hour. While another source gives an estimate of more than 100 squads, each supervised by a foreman or "straw boss", of 50 to 80 men were at work in the park; 5,000 to 8,000 workers.

== Fire ==
A little after 2:00 p.m. PDT, a small fire started in a pile of debris in Mineral Wells Canyon. Many of the workers volunteered or were ordered to fight the fire, but it spread up the canyon. Because there was no piped water in the area, the men tried to beat out the fire with shovels. Foremen with no knowledge of firefighting initially directed the effort, setting inappropriate back fires and sending hundreds of workers into a steep canyon. The fire department arrived at 2:26 p.m. but found it hard to fight the fire because of the presence of thousands of untrained people. When the wind changed direction at about 3:00 p.m., the fire rushed up Dam Canyon, jumped a hastily constructed firebreak, and advanced on the workers, killing dozens and injuring more than 100. By nightfall the fire was under control, after burning about 47 acres (19 ha) of the park's 4,200 acres (1,700 ha).

== Aftermath ==
Because of the disorganized nature of the deployment and the often inaccurate recordkeeping of the work project, it took weeks to establish the exact death toll and identify the bodies. A month after the fire, the Los Angeles County district attorney's office put the official death toll at 29, with 27 dead at the scene and two dead in hospitals afterwards. The Griffith Park fire remained the single-deadliest wildfire in California history for 85 years until being surpassed by the Camp Fire in 2018, which killed 85 people.

To commemorate the fallen workers, a deodar tree was planted at the entrance to the park along with a memorial plaque. The plaque can no longer be found. The courts ruled that victims were not eligible for civil compensation due to their unofficial employment by a 'straw boss' (Ca. Public Resources Code).

== See also ==
- List of California wildfires
- Bibliography of Los Angeles
- Outline of the history of Los Angeles
- Bibliography of California history
