= Prescott Fire Department =

City department

Operational area
- Country: United States
- State: Arizona
- City: Prescott

Agency overview
- Established: 1885
- Annual calls: 8737 (2012)
- Employees: 92
- Staffing: Career
- EMS level: ALS
- IAFF: 3066

Facilities and equipment
- Stations: 5
- Engines: 7
- Trucks: 2
- HAZMAT: 1
- Airport crash: 1
- Wildland: 4 - Type 6

Website
- Official website
- IAFF website

The Prescott Fire Department is the municipal fire department for the city of Prescott, Arizona. Additionally, the PFD provides aircraft rescue and firefighting for the Prescott Municipal Airport. Founded in 1885, it is the oldest fire department in the state of Arizona. It was the first municipal fire dept. in the US to have a hotshot qualified fire crew. With a coverage area of 41.5 square miles (107 km^{2}) and serving a population of 39,843, the PFD consists of 92 career personnel, split among five fire stations.

== History ==
Prescott's official fire protection system began in 1884 with the installation of wells in the courthouse plaza and the formation of the Prescott Volunteer Fire Department. In 1954, it merged with three other volunteer companies; they renamed themselves the Prescott Fire Department.

== Granite Mountain Hotshots ==
The Granite Mountain Hotshots were a group within the department whose mission was to fight wildfires. Founded in 2002 as a fuels mitigation crew, it transitioned to a handcrew (Type 2 I/A) in 2004, and ultimately to a hotshot crew in 2008. The crew had their own fire station, station 7, where equipment, including two 10-person crew carriers, was housed. The 2017 film Only the Brave was based on the Granite Mountain Hotshots and the Yarnell Hill Fire.

=== Yarnell Fire fatalities ===
On June 30, 2013, 19 members of the 20-man group died fighting the Yarnell Hill Fire. Only Brendan McDonough survived. The firefighters had apparently deployed fire shelters, but not all of the bodies were found inside them. According to the National Fire Protection Association, it was the greatest loss of life for firefighters in a wildfire since 1933, the deadliest wildfire of any kind since 1991, and one of the greatest losses of firefighters in the United States next to the September 11 attacks.

== Stations and apparatus ==
Fire Station Number	Address	Engine Companies	Truck Companies	Wildland Units	Special units
71	333 White Spar Rd.	Engine 71, Engine 711	Truck 71	Patrol 71	Utility 71 & Battalion 1
72	1700 Iron Springs Rd.	Engine 72, Engine 722	Truck 72	Patrol 72	
73	1980 Clubhouse Dr. Prescott Municipal Airport	Engine 73		Patrol 73	Foam 73
74	2747 Smoke Tree Lane	Engine 74			Boat 74
75	315 Lee Blvd.	Engine 75		Patrol 75	Haz-Mat Unit
