= Gliese 179 =

Star in the constellation Orion

Observation data Epoch J2000.0 Equinox ICRS
- Constellation: Orion
- Right ascension: 04^{h} 52^{m} 05.73212^{s}
- Declination: +06° 28′ 35.5887″
- Apparent magnitude (V): 11.94

Characteristics
- Spectral type: M2V or M3.5
- Apparent magnitude (U): 14.791
- Apparent magnitude (B): 13.530
- Apparent magnitude (R): 10.85
- Apparent magnitude (I): 9.334
- Apparent magnitude (J): 7.814±0.024
- Apparent magnitude (H): 7.209±0.046
- Apparent magnitude (K): 6.942±0.018
- U−B color index: 1.26
- B−V color index: 1.590±0.015
- V−R color index: 1.09
- R−I color index: 1.52

Astrometry
Radial velocity (R_{v})	–9.05±0.15 km/s
Proper motion (μ)	RA: 153.615 mas/yr Dec.: −306.046 mas/yr
Parallax (π)	80.5623±0.0236 mas
Distance	40.48 ± 0.01 ly (12.413 ± 0.004 pc)
Absolute magnitude (M_{V})	11.50

Details
Mass	0.400±0.005 M_{☉} 0.357±0.03 M_{☉}
Radius	0.400±0.005 R_{☉} 0.318±0.024 R_{☉} 0.38±0.02 R_{☉}
Luminosity	0.0158±0.0003 L_{☉} 0.016±0.02 L_{☉}
Surface gravity (log g)	4.148 cgs
Temperature	3,424±16 K
Metallicity [Fe/H]	+0.36±0.04 dex +0.30±0.10 dex +0.12 dex
Age	4.6+3.5 −2.4 Gyr

Other designations
- GJ 179, HIP 22627, G 83-37, 84-15, 82-52, LTT 11525, NLTT 14088, Ross 401, Wolf 1539

Database references
SIMBAD	data
Exoplanet Archive	data
ARICNS	data

Gliese 179 is a small red dwarf star with an exoplanetary companion in the equatorial constellation of Orion. It is much too faint to be visible to the naked eye with an apparent visual magnitude of 11.94. The system is located at a distance of 40.5 light-years (12.4 parsecs) from the Sun based on parallax measurements, but is drifting closer with a radial velocity of –9 km/s. It is a high proper motion star, traversing the celestial sphere at an angular rate of 0.370″·yr^{−1}.

This is an M-type main-sequence star with a stellar classification of M2V. Based on the motion of this star through space, it is estimated to be roughly 4.6 billion years old. It is chromospherically active with a projected rotational velocity of 4 km/s. This star is smaller and less massive than the Sun, but has a higher metal content. It is radiating just 1.6% of the luminosity of the Sun from its photosphere at an effective temperature of 3,424 K.

In 2009, a Jovian-type planet was found in orbit around the star, one of the few red dwarfs known to harbor a planet of this mass. The radial velocity data suggested there may be an additional companion. At the orbital distance of this planet, it is not expected to be influenced by tidal interactions with the host star. In 2023, the inclination and true mass of Gliese 179 b were determined via astrometry. A second candidate planet was reported in 2017 and was also reported in a 2019 preprint. This is a potential super-Earth with a minimum mass equal to about five times the mass of the Earth.

The Gliese 179 planetary system
Companion (in order from star)	Mass	Semimajor axis (AU)	Orbital period (days)	Eccentricity	Inclination (°)	Radius
c (unconfirmed)	≥4.9±2.7 M_{🜨}	0.032±0.003	3.4798+0.0014 −0.0010	0.04+0.27 −0.04	—	—
b	0.95+0.16 −0.11 M_{J}	2.424+0.071 −0.075	2,303+34 −31	0.179+0.048 −0.044	61+16 −13 or 119+13 −16	—

== See also ==
- HD 34445
- HD 126614
- HD 24496
- HD 13931
- QS Virginis
- HIP 79431
- Gliese 849
- Gliese 876
- Gliese 317
- Gliese 832
- List of extrasolar planets
