= Gliese 179 b =

Exoplanet which orbits the red dwarf star Gliese 179

Discovery
- Discovered by: Howard et al.
- Discovery site: Keck Observatory
- Discovery date: November 13, 2009
- Detection method: Radial velocity

Orbital characteristics
- Semi-major axis: 2.424+0.071 −0.075 AU
- Eccentricity: 0.179+0.048 −0.044
- Orbital period (sidereal): 2,303+34 −31 d 6.306+0.094 −0.086 yr
- Inclination: 61°+16° −13° or 119°+13° −16°
- Longitude of ascending node: 62°+99° −44°
- Time of periastron: 2,457,301+125 −150
- Argument of periastron: 129°+21° −19°
- Semi-amplitude: 33.9±6.6
- Star: Gliese 179

Physical characteristics
- Mass: 0.95+0.16 −0.11 M_{J}

Gliese 179 b (also known as HIP 22627 b) is an extrasolar planet which orbits the M-type main-sequence star Gliese 179, located approximately 40 light-years away in the constellation Orion. This planet has a minimum mass somewhat less than Jupiter and it orbits at 2.42 AU from the star with an eccentricity slightly less than Pluto. The planetary distance ranges from 1.90 to 2.92 AU. This planet was discovered by using the radial velocity method from spectrograph taken at Keck Observatory on November 13, 2009. In 2023, the inclination and true mass of Gliese 179 b were determined via astrometry.

== See also ==
Other planets that were discovered or confirmed on November 13, 2009:

- HD 34445 b
- HD 126614 Ab
- HD 13931 b

Other giant planets around red dwarfs:

- HIP 79431 b
- Gliese 849 b
- Gliese 876 b
- Gliese 876 c
- Gliese 317 b
- Gliese 832 b
