= HD 34445 =

Star in the constellation Orion

Observation data Epoch J2000.0 Equinox ICRS
- Constellation: Orion
- Right ascension: 05^{h} 17^{m} 40.9804^{s}
- Declination: +07° 21′ 12.055″
- Apparent magnitude (V): 7.31±0.03

Characteristics
- Spectral type: G0 V
- B−V color index: 0.661 ± 0.015

Astrometry
Radial velocity (R_{v})	−78.906±0.0082 km/s
Proper motion (μ)	RA: −0.811±0.076 mas/yr Dec.: −146.997±0.061 mas/yr
Parallax (π)	21.6675±0.0464 mas
Distance	150.5 ± 0.3 ly (46.15 ± 0.10 pc)
Absolute magnitude (M_{V})	4.04±0.10

Details
Mass	1.07±0.02 M_{☉}
Radius	1.38±0.08 R_{☉}
Luminosity	2.01 ± 0.2 L_{☉}
Surface gravity (log g)	4.21 ± 0.08 cgs
Temperature	5836 ± 44 K
Metallicity [Fe/H]	+0.14±0.04 dex +0.24±0.04 dex
Rotation	~22 d, ~52 d
Rotational velocity (v sin i)	2.7±0.5 km/s
Age	8.5±2.0 Gyr

Other designations
- BD+07°855, HD 34445, HIP 24681, SAO 112601

Database references
SIMBAD	data
Exoplanet Archive	data

HD 34445 is a star in the equatorial constellation of Orion. With an apparent visual magnitude of 7.31, it is a 7th magnitude star that is too dim to be readily visible to the naked eye. The system is located at a distance of 150.5 light years from the Sun based on parallax measurements, but is drifting closer with a high radial velocity of −79 km/s. It is expected to draw as close as 57.5 light-years in ~492,000 years.

This is an ordinary G-type main-sequence star with a stellar classification of G0 V, which means it is a Sun-like star that is generating energy through core hydrogen fusion. It is considered a metal-rich star, showing a much higher metallicity compared to the Sun. Despite this it is an older star and chromospherically quiet, lying about 0.8 magnitudes above the main sequence. This star is larger, hotter, brighter, and more massive than the Sun. It is spinning with a projected rotational velocity of ~3 km/s, giving it a rotation period of around 22 days.

== Planetary companions ==
In 2004, a gas giant was found in orbit around the star, but it was not until 2009 that this planet was confirmed. In 2017, five more planets were found. All have minimum masses significantly greater than that of the Earth, between 16.8 M_{🜨} and 200.0 M_{🜨}. The system as configured appears to be dynamically stable.

A 2021 study was only able to confirm HD 34445 b as a planet. HD 34445 e was found to likely be an artifact of the stellar rotation, as its orbital period closely matched to the rotation period of the star, HD 34445 c & d were also found to likely be false positives having orbital periods of around 1/4 and 1/3 of a year, and HD 34445 f was not detected.

The HD 34445 planetary system
Companion (in order from star)	Mass	Semimajor axis (AU)	Orbital period (days)	Eccentricity	Inclination (°)	Radius
e (unconfirmed)	≥0.0529 ± 0.0089 M_{J}	0.2687 ± 0.0019	49.175 ± 0.045	0.090 ± 0.062	—	—
d (unconfirmed)	≥0.097 ± 0.13 M_{J}	0.4817 ± 0.0033	117.87 ± 0.18	0.027 ± 0.051	—	—
c (unconfirmed)	≥0.168 ± 0.016 M_{J}	0.7181 ± 0.0049	214.67 ± 0.45	0.036 ± 0.071	—	—
f (unconfirmed)	≥0.119 ± 0.021 M_{J}	1.543 ± 0.016	676.8 ± 7.9	0.031 ± 0.057	—	—
b	≥0.629 ± 0.028 M_{J}	2.075 ± 0.016	1056.7 ± 4.7	0.014 ± 0.035	—	—
g (unconfirmed)	≥0.38 ± 0.13 M_{J}	6.36 ± 1.02	5700 ± 1500	0.032 ± 0.080	—	—

== See also ==
- HD 126614
- HD 24496
- HD 13931
- Gliese 179
- QS Virginis
- List of extrasolar planets
