= HD 126614 =

Multiple star system in the constellation Virgo

Observation data Epoch J2000 Equinox ICRS
- Constellation: Virgo
- HD 126614 A
- Right ascension: 14^{h} 26^{m} 48.27949^{s}
- Declination: −05° 10′ 40.0131″
- Apparent magnitude (V): 8.81±0.03
- LP 680-57
- Right ascension: 14^{h} 26^{m} 45.83640^{s}
- Declination: −05° 10′ 19.4279″
- Apparent magnitude (V): 16.68±0.20

Characteristics

A
- Evolutionary stage: subgiant
- Spectral type: G8IV
- Apparent magnitude (B): 9.620
- Apparent magnitude (J): 7.470±0.021
- Apparent magnitude (H): 7.160±0.042
- Apparent magnitude (K): 7.060±0.036
- B−V color index: 0.810±0.004

C
- Evolutionary stage: main sequence
- Spectral type: M

B
- Evolutionary stage: main sequence
- Spectral type: M5.5V

Astrometry

HD 126614 A
Radial velocity (R_{v})	−32.897±0.0042 km/s
Proper motion (μ)	RA: −149.760±0.023 mas/yr Dec.: −145.837±0.018 mas/yr
Parallax (π)	13.6633±0.0166 mas
Distance	238.7 ± 0.3 ly (73.19 ± 0.09 pc)
Absolute magnitude (M_{V})	4.52

LP 680-57
Radial velocity (R_{v})	−29.45±5.52 km/s
Proper motion (μ)	RA: −147.861±0.038 mas/yr Dec.: −149.118±0.034 mas/yr
Parallax (π)	13.6050±0.0316 mas
Distance	239.7 ± 0.6 ly (73.5 ± 0.2 pc)
Absolute magnitude (M_{V})	12.02

Orbit
Primary	HD 126614 A
Secondary	HD 126614 C
Period (P)	59.979+4.696 −5.059 yr
Semi-major axis (a)	15.229+0.984 −1.094 AU
Eccentricity (e)	0.056+0.017 −0.018
Inclination (i)	16.294+0.881 −0.771°
Longitude of the node (Ω)	284.664+2.600 −3.304°
Periastron epoch (T)	2450124.747+26.090 −28.486
Argument of periastron (ω) (secondary)	240.567+30.578 −43.150°
Semi-amplitude (K_{1}) (primary)	0.167573+0.012902 −0.011124 km/s

Details

HD 126614 A
Mass	0.955 M_{☉}
Radius	1.32 R_{☉}
Luminosity	1.44 L_{☉}
Surface gravity (log g)	4.18 cgs
Temperature	5,503 K
Metallicity	+0.42
Rotation	~99 days
Rotational velocity (v sin i)	2.0±0.5 km/s
Age	7.2±2.0 Gyr

HD 126614 C
Mass	81.128+7.778 −7.922 M_{Jup}

LP 680-57 (B)
Mass	0.32 M_{☉}
Radius	0.32 R_{☉}
Luminosity	0.0106 L_{☉}
Surface gravity (log g)	4.93 cgs
Temperature	3,275 K
Metallicity [Fe/H]	+0.46 dex
Age	3.6 – 6.0 Gyr

Other designations
- HD 126614, WDS J14268-0511
- HD 126614 A: BD−04°3690, HIP 70623, SAO 139932, PPM 197558, G 124-40, LTT 5698, NLTT 37355
- LP 680-57: LP 680-57, NLTT 37349

Database references
SIMBAD	A
- LP 680-57
Exoplanet Archive	data

HD 126614 is a trinary star system in the equatorial constellation of Virgo. The primary member, designated component A, is host to an exoplanetary companion. With an apparent visual magnitude of 8.81, it is too faint to be seen with the naked eye. The system is located at a distance of 239 light years from the Sun based on parallax measurements, but is drifting closer with a radial velocity of −33 km/s.

== Stellar system ==
=== HD 126614 A ===
The primary is a late G-type star with a stellar classification of G8IV. It is a super metal-rich star; among the most metal-rich stars currently known. This is most likely an evolving subgiant star, but the very high metallicity makes comparisons to standard spectral types difficult.

=== HD 126614 C ===
In 2010, a close stellar companion was resolved and designated component C. This object is a faint red dwarf at an angular separation of 0.5″, which corresponds to a projected physical separation of ~ 36 AU. More recent observations using radial velocity and astrometry have refined the parameters of HD 126614 C. It has an orbital period of about 60 years, with a smaller semi-major axis of 15 AU and a very low mass of 81.1 M_{J}. This mass is very near the mass limit allowed for hydrogen fusion.

=== HD 126614 B ===
The outer companion, designated LP 680-57, was first reported in 1960 with the W. J. Luyten proper motion catalog. It is a magnitude 17.0 red dwarf with a class of M5.5, located at an angular separation of 41.90″ from the primary along a position angle of 299°, as of 2015. They have a physical projected separation of 3,040 AU. The common proper motion of the system has been confirmed, indicating that they are gravitationally bound. Many multiple star catalogues still refer to this companion as component B, as it was known prior to the discovery of the closer companion.

== Planetary system ==
A Doppler search for giant planets begun in 1997 at the Keck Observatory provided an 11 year baseline for detecting periodicity in the primary star's radial velocity data. In 2010, a Jovian companion was announced with an orbital period of 3.41 years. In 2022, the inclination and true mass of HD 126614 Ab were measured via astrometry.

The HD 126614 A planetary system
Companion (in order from star)	Mass	Semimajor axis (AU)	Orbital period (years)	Eccentricity	Inclination (°)	Radius
b	0.41+0.20 −0.06 M_{J}	2.29±0.03	3.442+0.016 −0.017	0.55±0.06	90±40	—

== See also ==
- HD 34445
- HD 24496
- HD 13931
- Gliese 179
- QS Virginis
- List of extrasolar planets
