= Gliese 876 e =

Exoplanet orbiting the star Gliese 876

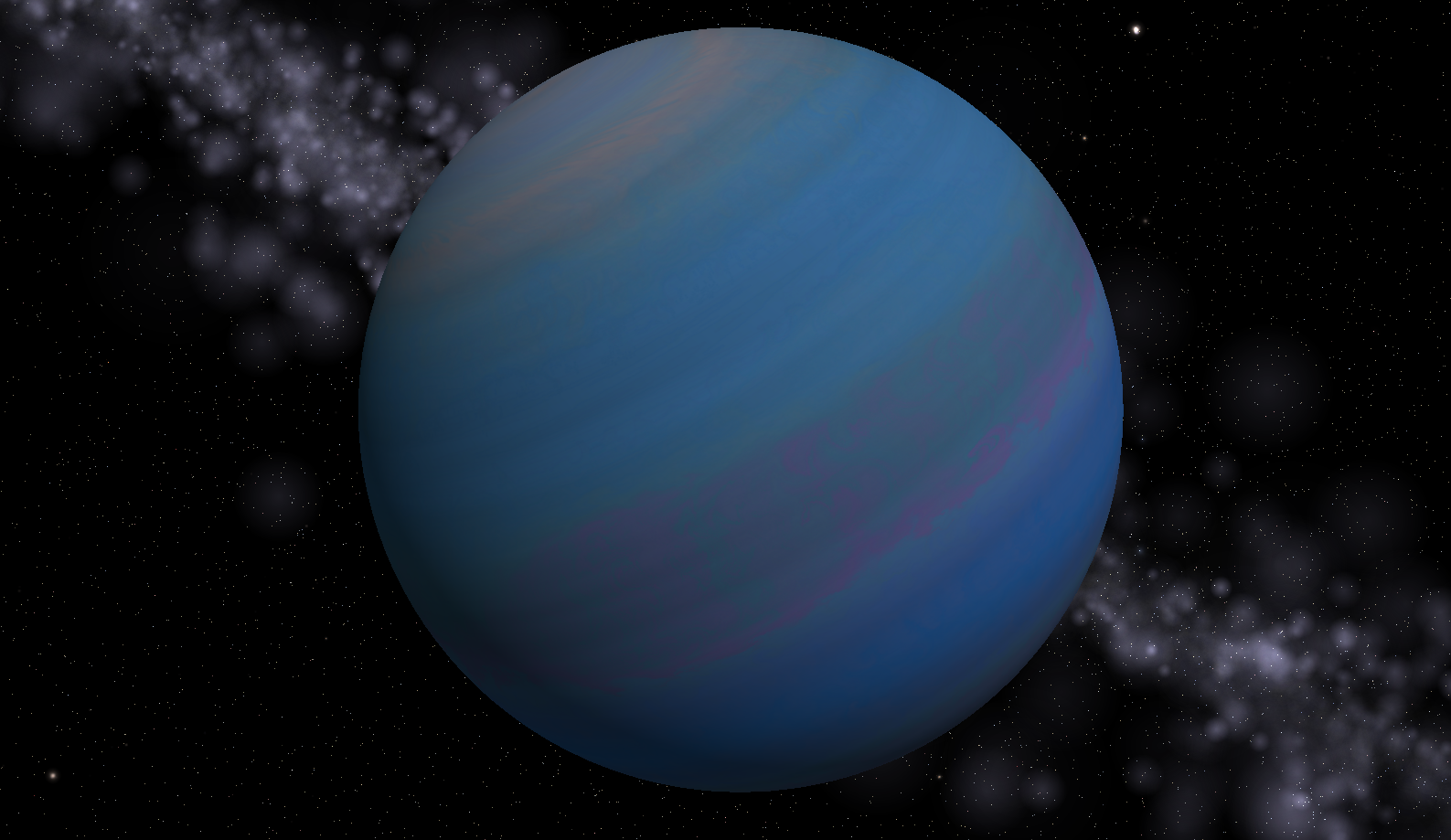
- An artist's impression of Gliese 876 e

Discovery
- Discovered by: Rivera et al.
- Discovery date: June 23, 2010
- Detection method: Doppler spectroscopy

Orbital characteristics
- Epoch BJD 2,450,602.09311
- Semi-major axis: 0.3355+0.0019 −0.0011 AU
- Eccentricity: 0.0545+0.0069 −0.022
- Orbital period (sidereal): 123.55+1.0 −0.59 d
- Mean anomaly: 50.3°+46° −86.8°
- Inclination: 56.7°+1.0° −0.99°
- Argument of periastron: 240°+23° −50°
- Semi-amplitude: 3.49±0.23 m/s
- Star: Gliese 876

Physical characteristics
- Mass: 16.0±1.0 M_{🜨}

The orbits of the planets of Gliese 876. Gliese 876 e is the furthest planet from the star.

Gliese 876 e is an exoplanet orbiting the star Gliese 876 in the constellation of Aquarius. It is in a 1:2:4 Laplace resonance with the planets Gliese 876 c and Gliese 876 b: for each orbit of planet e, planet b completes two orbits and planet c completes four. This configuration is the second known example of a Laplace resonance after Jupiter's moons Io, Europa and Ganymede. Its orbit takes 124 days to complete.

Gliese 876 e has a mass similar to that of the planet Uranus. Its orbit takes 124 days to complete, or roughly one third of a year. While the orbital period is longer than that of Mercury around the Sun, the lower mass of the host star relative to the Sun means the planet's orbit has a slightly smaller semimajor axis. Unlike Mercury, Gliese 876 e has a nearly circular orbit with an eccentricity of 0.055 ± 0.012.

This planet, like b and c, has likely migrated inward.
