= V348 Andromedae =

Variable star system in constellation Andromeda

Observation data Epoch J2000.0 Equinox ICRS
- Constellation: Andromeda
- Right ascension: 00^{h} 15^{m} 17.84^{s}
- Declination: +44° 12′ 12.2″
- Apparent magnitude (V): 6.77±0.01

Characteristics
- Evolutionary stage: Main-sequence
- Spectral type: B9V + B9V + B8V
- Variable type: Algol

Astrometry
Radial velocity (R_{v})	−11.63±0.52 km/s
Proper motion (μ)	RA: 5.461 mas/yr Dec.: -3.053 mas/yr
Parallax (π)	2.92 mas
Distance	1,117 ly (342 pc)

Orbit
Primary	A
Name	B
Period (P)	27.703514±0.000325 days
Semi-major axis (a)	68.28±0.87 R_{☉}
Eccentricity (e)	0.116±0.012
Inclination (i)	88.26±0.02°
Periastron epoch (T)	2,455,923.129±0.025 HJD
Argument of periastron (ω) (secondary)	95.6±0.2°
Semi-amplitude (K_{1}) (primary)	61.22±0.81 km/s
Semi-amplitude (K_{2}) (secondary)	63.76±0.85 km/s

Orbit
Primary	AB
Name	C
Period (P)	86.9±4.3 yr
Semi-major axis (a)	0.118±0.013″
Eccentricity (e)	0.559±0.015
Inclination (i)	66.0±3.9°
Longitude of the node (Ω)	61.1±2.4°
Periastron epoch (T)	2,451,501±96 HJD
Argument of periastron (ω) (secondary)	140±10°

Details

A
Mass	2.81±0.04 M_{☉}
Radius	2.42±0.03 R_{☉}
Temperature	10,500 K

B
Mass	2.69±0.04 M_{☉}
Radius	2.34±0.03 R_{☉}
Temperature	10,412±87 K

C
Mass	3.4 M_{☉}

Other designations
- V348 And, BD+43 33, HD 1082, SAO 36202, TIC 440062036, 2MASS J00151782+4412122

Database references
SIMBAD	data

V348 Andromedae is a multiple star system located approximately 1,100 light-years from Earth in the constellation of Andromeda. Its combined apparent visual magnitude of around 6.77 makes it visible to the naked eye under good conditions.

== Characteristics ==
The primary pair consists of an Algol type eclipsing binary system of two B-type main-sequence stars. Both components share a spectral type of B9V, possess masses of 2.81 M_{☉} and 2.69 M_{☉}, respectively, and have an orbital period of approximately 27.7 days. This inner binary pair is accompanied by a tertiary companion of spectral type B8V with a mass of 3.4 M_{☉} in a wide orbit with an orbital period of about 87 years, making the system a hierarchical triple star system.
