= LL Aquarii =

Binary star in the constellation Aquarius

Observation data Epoch J2000.0 Equinox ICRS
- Constellation: Aquarius
- Right ascension: 22^{h} 34^{m} 42.153^{s}
- Declination: −03° 35′ 58.17″
- Apparent magnitude (V): 9.23; Min I: 9.86; Min II: 9.59

Characteristics
- Evolutionary stage: main sequence
- Spectral type: F9 V + G3 V
- U−B color index: 0.029
- B−V color index: 0.601±0.037
- Variable type: Algol

Astrometry
Radial velocity (R_{v})	−9.59±0.46 km/s
Proper motion (μ)	RA: 73.192 mas/yr Dec.: −21.545 mas/yr
Parallax (π)	7.297±0.0219 mas
Distance	447 ± 1 ly (137.0 ± 0.4 pc)
Absolute magnitude (M_{V})	3.95

Orbit
Period (P)	20.178322(1) days
Semi-major axis (a)	40.744±0.007 R_{☉}
Eccentricity (e)	0.3163±0.0003
Inclination (i)	89.545±0.003°
Longitude of the node (Ω)	32.11±0.14°
Periastron epoch (T)	2460223.84444(1) BJD
Argument of periastron (ω) (secondary)	155.69±0.12°
Semi-amplitude (K_{1}) (primary)	49.948±0.013 km/s
Semi-amplitude (K_{2}) (secondary)	57.736±0.014 km/s

Details

Primary
Mass	1.1947(9) M_{☉}
Radius	1.3180(13) R_{☉}
Luminosity	2.377 L_{☉}
Surface gravity (log g)	4.2755(9) cgs
Temperature	6,242±50 K
Metallicity [Fe/H]	0.075±0.030 dex
Rotation	19.1±3.2 days
Rotational velocity (v sin i)	3.5±0.5 km/s
Age	3.01±0.12 Gyr

Secondary
Mass	1.0334(6) M_{☉}
Radius	0.9927(8) R_{☉}
Luminosity	1.030 L_{☉}
Surface gravity (log g)	4.4587(8) cgs
Temperature	5,839±44 K
Metallicity [Fe/H]	0.052±0.027 dex
Rotation	14.0±1.7 days
Rotational velocity (v sin i)	3.6±0.4 km/s
Age	2.67±0.12 Gyr

Other designations
- LL Aqr, BD−04°5706, HD 213896, HIP 111454, SAO 146171, PPM 206522

Database references
SIMBAD	data

LL Aquarii is an eclipsing binary star system in the equatorial constellation of Aquarius, abbreviated LL Aqr. At peak brightness it has a combined apparent visual magnitude of 9.23, which is too dim to be visible to the naked eye. Based on parallax measurements, it is located at a distance of approximately 447 light years from the Sun. The system is drifting closer with a heliocentric radial velocity of about −10 km/s.

== Observations ==
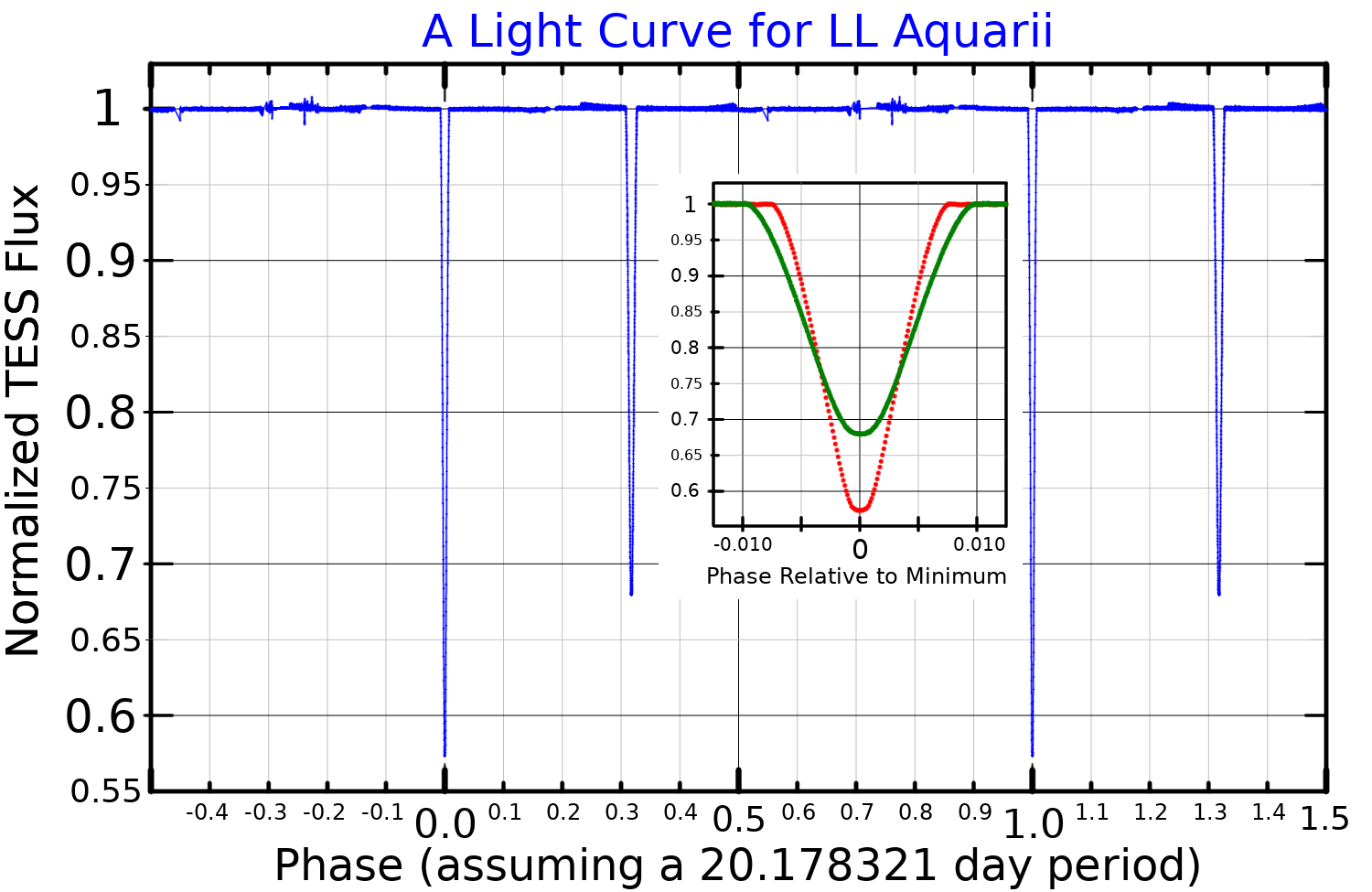
A light curve for LL Aquarii, plotted from TESS data. The main plot shows the complete light curve, and the inset plot shows that primary (red) and secondary (green) minima with an expanded horizontal scale.

In 1996, this star was found to be an Algol-type eclipsing binary based on photometric observations made with the Hipparcos space observatory. It was assigned the variable-star designation LL Aqr in 1999. This is a detached system forming a double-lined spectroscopic binary. In 2004, a more extensive light curve showed an eccentric orbit with a period of 20.1784 days. During the primary eclipse, the system dropped to magnitude 9.86, while the secondary eclipse showed a magnitude of 9.59. The first orbital elements were published in 2008, showing an orbital eccentricity of 0.3095 with a mass ratio of 0.86. Stellar models indicated the stars are near the mid point of their main sequence lifetimes.

The more massive member of the system, the primary component, has a stellar classification of F9 V, matching an F-type main-sequence star. It has 19.5% more mass than the Sun and a 32% greater girth. This star is radiating 2.15 times the luminosity of the Sun from its photosphere at an effective temperature of around 6,080 K. It is spinning with a projected rotational velocity of 3.5±0.5 km/s. The metallicity, or abundance of elements with mass greater than helium, is very nearly Sun-like.

The secondary component is considered a solar twin, which means its properties are close to Sun-like. It is a G-type main-sequence star with a class of G3 V. Neither member of the system shows signs of stellar activity, being slowly rotating and not emitting X-rays. Tidal effects between the two stars is negligible; they have an orbital separation of 40.7 times the radius of the Sun.
