= Gliese 649 =

Star in the constellation Hercules

Observation data Epoch J2000.0 Equinox ICRS
- Constellation: Hercules
- Right ascension: 16^{h} 58^{m} 08.850^{s}
- Declination: +25° 44′ 38.97″
- Apparent magnitude (V): 9.655

Characteristics
- Evolutionary stage: Main sequence
- Spectral type: M1.0V
- Apparent magnitude (B): 11.222
- Apparent magnitude (R): 8.80
- Apparent magnitude (I): 8.000
- Apparent magnitude (J): 6.448
- Apparent magnitude (H): 5.865
- Apparent magnitude (K): 5.624
- B−V color index: 1.48
- V−R color index: 0.8
- R−I color index: 0.8

Astrometry
Radial velocity (R_{v})	3.76±0.13 km/s
Proper motion (μ)	RA: −115.314(21) mas/yr Dec.: −508.087(26) mas/yr
Parallax (π)	96.2333±0.0244 mas
Distance	33.892 ± 0.009 ly (10.391 ± 0.003 pc)
Absolute magnitude (M_{V})	9.63

Details
Mass	0.524±0.012 M_{☉}
Radius	0.531±0.012 R_{☉}
Luminosity	0.04373±0.00045 L_{☉}
Surface gravity (log g)	4.76±0.04 cgs
Temperature	3,621^{+41}_{−40} K
Metallicity [Fe/H]	−0.15±0.09 dex
Rotation	24.89+0.34 −0.35 d
Age	2.96±0.51 Gyr

Other designations
- BD+25 3173, HIP 83043, TYC 2063-00479-1, 2MASS J16580884+2544392

Database references
SIMBAD	data
Exoplanet Archive	data
ARICNS	data

Gliese 649 is a small star with an orbiting exoplanet in the constellation Hercules. It has an apparent visual magnitude of 9.7, which is too faint to be seen with the naked eye. The system is located at a distance of 33.9 light years based on parallax, and is drifting further away with a radial velocity of 3.8 km/s.

This is an M-type main-sequence star, a red dwarf, with a stellar classification of M1.0V. It has 52% of the mass of the Sun and 53% of the Sun's girth. In the visible light band, the star is radiating 4.4% of the luminosity of the Sun from its photosphere at an effective temperature of 3,621 K. It is spinning slowly with a rotation period of 24.9 days.

== Planetary system ==
A Saturn-mass planet was detected around the red dwarf star by J. A. Johnson and associates in 2010. It has a minimum mass 32.8% of Jupiter's mass and is located 1.15 astronomical units from its star in eccentric orbit (e=0.3). Assuming a luminosity of 4.5% that of the Sun, the habitable zone is located at 0.21 AU, thus the planet should be as cold as if it were located at 5.5 AU from a Solar-like star. Also accounting for different periastron and apastron positions of 0.8 and 1.49 AU respectively, the planet could likely show seasonal temperature changes.

=== Debris disk ===
Using results from the Herschel Space Observatory survey of 21 late-type stars carried out in 2010, a debris disk was discovered between approximately 6 and 30 AU. The disk was not detected at 22μm by NASA's Wide-field Infrared Survey Explorer so therefore it is likely to be below 100 Kelvin and similar to the Kuiper belt. The disk was marginally resolved, appearing very asymmetric, and so is probably consistent with being closer to edge-on, rather than face-on, in its inclination.

The Gliese 649 planetary system
Companion (in order from star)	Mass	Semimajor axis (AU)	Orbital period (days)	Eccentricity	Inclination (°)	Radius
b	≥0.258+0.023 −0.022 M_{J}	1.112+0.035 −0.037	600.1±1.7	0.083+0.068 −0.055	—	—
Kuiper belt	~6–~30 AU				~45-90°	—

== See also ==
- Gliese 317
- Gliese 849
- List of extrasolar planets
