= HIP 79431 =

Red dwarf star in the constellation Scorpius

HIP 79431 / Sharjah
Observation data Epoch J2000.0 Equinox ICRS
- Constellation: Scorpius
- Right ascension: 16^{h} 12^{m} 41.77941^{s}
- Declination: −18° 52′ 31.8117″
- Apparent magnitude (V): 11.34

Characteristics
- Spectral type: M3V
- Apparent magnitude (B): 12.826
- Apparent magnitude (R): 10.46
- Apparent magnitude (I): 9.370
- Apparent magnitude (J): 7.555±0.026
- Apparent magnitude (H): 6.855±0.044
- Apparent magnitude (K): 6.589±0.018
- B−V color index: 1.486±0.011
- V−R color index: 0.88
- R−I color index: 1.09

Astrometry
Radial velocity (R_{v})	−4.93±0.19 km/s
Proper motion (μ)	RA: 36.447 mas/yr Dec.: −214.025 mas/yr
Parallax (π)	68.6100±0.0287 mas
Distance	47.54 ± 0.02 ly (14.575 ± 0.006 pc)
Absolute magnitude (M_{V})	10.55

Details
Mass	0.49±0.05 M_{☉} 0.445 M_{☉} 0.466 M_{☉}
Radius	0.54±0.02 R_{☉} 0.391 R_{☉} 0.442 R_{☉}
Surface gravity (log g)	4.86 cgs 4.815 cgs
Temperature	3,689±20 K
Metallicity [Fe/H]	+0.46±0.17 dex

Other designations
- Sharjah, HIP 79431, LP 804-27, NLTT 42226

Database references
SIMBAD	data
Exoplanet Archive	data
ARICNS	data

HIP 79431 is a red dwarf star with a planetary companion in the constellation Scorpius. It has the proper name Sharjah, as selected in the NameExoWorlds campaign by United Arab Emirates, during the 100th anniversary of the IAU. Sharjah is the cultural capital of United Arab Emirates. The star has an apparent visual magnitude of 11.34, which is far too faint to be visible to the naked eye. Based on parallax measurements, this system is located at a distance of 47.4 light-years from the Sun. It is drifting closer with a radial velocity of −5 km/s.

This is an M-type main-sequence star with a stellar classification of M3V. This star is smaller, cooler, dimmer, and less massive than the Sun, but the estimated metal content is 2.5 times as much as the Sun. The level of chromospheric activity does not appear to be unusually high for a star of this class.

In 2010, a superjovian exoplanetary companion was discovered using the radial-velocity method. It is orbiting at a distance of 0.36 AU from the host star with a period of 0.3 years and an eccentricity (ovalness) of 0.29. Since the inclination of the orbit is unknown, only a lower bound on the mass can be determined. It has at least 2.1 times the mass of Jupiter.

The star also shows anomalies in its proper motion and radial velocity variations, suggesting the presence of an outer planet between 5 and 12 AU, 11 times more massive than Jupiter.

The HIP 79431 planetary system
Companion (in order from star)	Mass	Semimajor axis (AU)	Orbital period (days)	Eccentricity	Inclination (°)	Radius
b / Barajeel	≥2.1 M_{J}	0.36	111.7±0.7	0.29±0.02	—	—

== See also ==
- Gliese 179
- List of extrasolar planets
