= HD 13931 b =

Extrasolar planet in the Andromeda constellation

Discovery
- Discovered by: Howard et al.
- Discovery site: Keck Observatory
- Discovery date: November 13, 2009
- Detection method: Radial velocity

Orbital characteristics
- Semi-major axis: 5.33 ± 0.09 AU (797,000,000 ± 13,000,000 km)
- Eccentricity: <0.04
- Orbital period (sidereal): 4442+49 −46 d (12.16 y)
- Average orbital speed: 13.3 ± 2.2
- Inclination: 39°+13° −8° or 141°+9° −18°
- Longitude of ascending node: 343°+17° −19° or 110°+19° −24°
- Time of periastron: 24494 ± 904
- Argument of periastron: 74 - 227
- Semi-amplitude: 22.8 ± 3.0
- Star: HD 13931

Physical characteristics
- Mass: 3.1+0.8 −0.7 M_{J}

HD 13931 b (also known as HIP 10626 b) is an extrasolar planet which orbits the G-type star HD 13931, located approximately 155 light years away in the constellation Andromeda. This planet takes 11.55 years to orbit the star at the average distance of 5.15 AU or 770 million km. The planet's eccentricity (0.02) is about the same as Earth. The orbital distance for this planet ranges from 5.05 to 5.25 AU. This planet was discovered by using radial velocity method from spectrograph taken at Keck Observatory on November 13, 2009.

In 2023, the inclination and true mass of HD 13931 b were measured via astrometry.

== See also ==
Other planets that were discovered or confirmed on November 13, 2009:

- HD 34445 b
- HD 126614 Ab
- Gliese 179 b
