= HD 34445 b =

Extrasolar planet in the constellation Orion that orbits the star HD 34445

Discovery
- Discovered by: Howard et al.
- Discovery site: Keck Observatory
- Discovery date: 2004
- Detection method: Radial velocity

Orbital characteristics
- Semi-major axis: 2.106+0.038 −0.040 AU
- Eccentricity: 0.103+0.059 −0.056
- Orbital period (sidereal): 1059.0+5.5 −5.6 d
- Argument of periastron: 47.0°+33.0° −130.0°
- Semi-amplitude: 12.35+0.63 −0.65 m/s
- Star: HD 34445

Physical characteristics
- Mass: ≥0.658+0.04 −0.04 M_{J}

HD 34445 b is an extrasolar planet which orbits the G-type star HD 34445, located approximately 150.5 light years away in the constellation Orion. This planet was discovered in 2004 and finally confirmed in 2009. This planet has a minimum mass two-thirds that of Jupiter and orbits in a roughly circular orbit about 2 AU from the parent star, within the habitable zone.

== See also ==
Other planets that were discovered or confirmed on November 13, 2009:

- HD 126614 Ab
- HD 13931 b
- Gliese 179 b
