= Gliese 649 b =

Exoplanet

Discovery
- Discovered by: Johnson et al.
- Discovery date: 2009-12-17
- Detection method: Radial velocity

Orbital characteristics
- Semi-major axis: 1.135±0.035 AU
- Eccentricity: 0.30±0.08
- Orbital period (sidereal): 598.3±4.2 d
- Time of periastron: 12876±22
- Argument of periastron: 352±15
- Semi-amplitude: 12.4±1.1
- Star: Gliese 649

Gliese 649 b /ˈɡliːzə/, or Gl 649 b is an extrasolar planet, orbiting the 10th magnitude M-type star Gliese 649, 10 parsecs from earth. This planet is a sub-Jupiter, massing 0.328 Jupiter mass and orbits at 1.135 AU.
