= HIP 79431 b =

Exoplanet

HIP 79431 b / Barajeel
Discovery
- Discovered by: Apps et al.
- Discovery site: Keck Observatory
- Discovery date: January 7, 2010
- Detection method: Doppler spectroscopy

Orbital characteristics
- Apastron: 0.46 AU (69,000,000 km)
- Periastron: 0.25 AU (37,000,000 km)
- Semi-major axis: 0.36 AU (54,000,000 km)
- Eccentricity: 0.29
- Orbital period (sidereal): 111.7 ± 0.7 d 0.306 y
- Average orbital speed: 35
- Time of periastron: 2454980.3 ± 1.2
- Argument of periastron: 287.4 ± 3.2
- Star: HIP 79431

HIP 79431 b is an extrasolar planet discovered by the W. M. Keck Observatory in 2010. The planet is found in an M type dwarf star catalogued as HIP 79431, and is located within the constellation Scorpius approximately 47 light years away from the Earth. Its orbital period lasts about 111.7 days and has an orbital eccentricity of 0.29. The planet is the 6th giant planet to be detected in the Doppler surveys of M dwarfs and is considered to be one of the most massive planets found around M dwarf stars.

The planet HIP 79431 b is named Barajeel. The name was selected in the NameExoWorlds campaign by the United Arab Emirates, during the 100th anniversary of the IAU. A barajeel is a wind tower used to direct the flow of the wind so that air can be recirculated as a form of air conditioning.

== Observations ==
HIP 79431 b is located in orbit around a star whose metallicity had been challenging to be assessed due to the uncertainties within the molecular data line, however it has not been typical for M Dwarfs to have strong emissions from the core data lines. This led to the inclusion of the HIP 79431 star to the KECK program in April 2009 as part of the exoplanet studies for low mass stars. During this study, 13 Doppler measurements of the star were done over a 6-month period using the High Resolution Echelle Spectrometer (HIRES). The exposure times used in its observation was 600 seconds which yielded a signal-to-noise ratio of just under 100. Each program observation required the use of iodine absorption lines in order to model the wavelength scale as well as the instrumental profile of the telescope and spectrometer optics. The Doppler experiments derived radial velocities fit the Keplerian model showing an unambiguous signal and orbital parameters which best fit planetary gravitational pull, this revealed the presence of the planet HIP 79431 b. However, there is no evidence that any additional planets was found.

== Low transit possibility ==
The planet HIP 79431 b has a low transit probability mainly due to its semi-major axis orientation. Another observation with regard to its eccentricity orbit is that it brings the planet closer to its star periastron increasing the probability of a transit, which was estimated as a meager 0.5%. According to the KECK program, if a transit would occur, the depth would be remarkable mainly due to the calculated mass of the planet.

== See also ==
- Gliese 179 b
