= Gliese 849 b =

Jovian planet orbiting Gliese 849

Discovery
- Discovered by: California and Carnegie Planet Search
- Discovery site: W. M. Keck Observatory; USA
- Discovery date: August 2006
- Detection method: radial velocity

Orbital characteristics
- Semi-major axis: 2.39±0.082 AU
- Eccentricity: 0.038±0.019
- Orbital period (sidereal): 1924±15 d
- Time of periastron: 2453770±150
- Argument of periastron: 66±28
- Semi-amplitude: 23.96±0.94
- Star: Gliese 849

Gliese 849 b is an extrasolar planet approximately 29 light years away in the constellation of Aquarius. It is the first long-period Jupiter-like planet discovered around a red dwarf, announced in August 2006 by the California and Carnegie Planet Search team using the radial velocity technique. The previously longest-period Jupiter-like planet around a red dwarf was Gliese 876 b. There are, however, two disproven longer period Jupiter-like planets around Lalande 21185. There are indications of a possible second companion. The planet's mass is less than that of Jupiter, though only the minimum mass is known. The distance of the planet is 2.35 AU and it takes 5.17 years (1890 days) to revolve in a circular orbit.

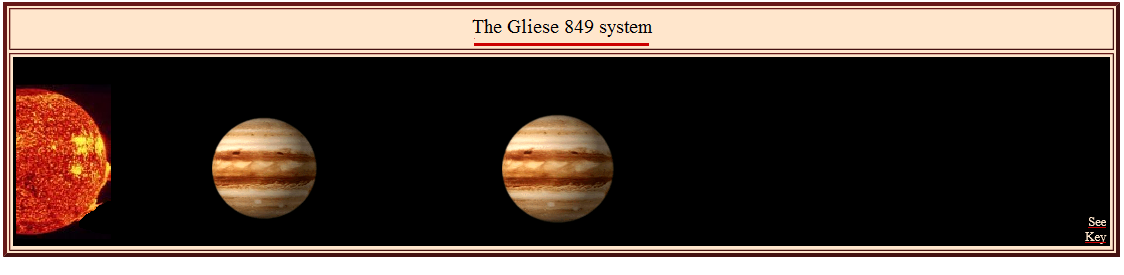
Diagram of the probable structure of the Gliese 849 Star system

== See also ==
- List of star systems within 25–30 light-years
