= HD 126614 Ab =

Extrasolar planet which orbits the star HD 126614 in the constellation Virgo

Discovery
- Discovered by: Howard et al.
- Discovery site: Keck Observatory
- Discovery date: November 13, 2009
- Detection method: Radial velocity

Orbital characteristics
- Semi-major axis: 2.249+0.088 −0.096 AU
- Eccentricity: 0.548+0.063 −0.062
- Orbital period (sidereal): 3.442 ± 0.02 years (1,257.2 ± 7.3 d)
- Inclination: 97.477°+35.340° −37.849°
- Longitude of ascending node: 182.778°+120.999° −117.633°
- Time of periastron: 2450124.747+26.090 −28.486
- Argument of periastron: 304.917°+9.910° −12.242°
- Semi-amplitude: 7.760+0.699 −0.516 m/s
- Star: HD 126614 A

Physical characteristics
- Mass: 0.339+0.204 −0.019 M_{J}

HD 126614 Ab, or simply HD 126614 b, (also known as HIP 70623 b) is an extrasolar planet which orbits the primary K-type star HD 126614 A, located approximately 240 light years away in the constellation Virgo. It was discovered on November 13, 2009. However, this planet has a highly eccentric orbit around its parent star. The planetary distance ranges from 0.94 AU to 3.61 AU. HD 126614 A also has the highest metallicity of any star hosting any exoplanets, at +0.56 dex.

In 2022, the true mass and inclination of HD 126614 Ab were measured via astrometry.

== See also ==
Other planets that were discovered or confirmed on November 13, 2009:

- HD 34445 b
- HD 13931 b
- Gliese 179 b
