= Heliocentric Julian Day =

Julian Date corrected for Earth's position

The Heliocentric Julian Date (HJD) is the Julian Date (JD) corrected for differences in the Earth's position with respect to the Sun. When timing events that occur beyond the Solar System, due to the finite speed of light, the time the event is observed depends on the changing position of the observer in the Solar System. Before multiple observations can be combined, they must be reduced to a common, fixed, reference location. This correction also depends on the direction to the object or event being timed.

== Magnitude and limitations ==
The correction is zero (HJD = JD) for objects at the poles of the ecliptic. Elsewhere, it is approximately an annual sine curve, and the highest amplitude occurs on the ecliptic. The maximum correction corresponds to the time in which light travels the distance from the Sun to the Earth, i.e. ±8.3 min (500 s, 0.0058 days).

JD and HJD are defined independent of the time standard. Rather, JD can be expressed as e.g. UTC, UT1, TT or TAI. The differences between these time standards are of the order of a minute, so that for minute accuracy of timings the standard used has to be stated. The HJD correction involves the heliocentric position of the Earth, which is expressed in TT. While the practical choice may be UTC, the natural choice is TT.

Since the Sun itself orbits around the barycentre of the Solar System, the HJD correction is not actually to a fixed reference. The difference between correction to the heliocentre and to the barycentre is up to ±4 s. For second accuracy, the Barycentric Julian Date (BJD) should be calculated instead of the HJD.

The common formulation of the HJD correction assumes that the object is at infinite distance, certainly beyond the Solar System. The resulting error for Edgeworth-Kuiper Belt objects would be 5 s, and for objects in the main asteroid belt it would be 100 s. In this calculation, the Moon – which is closer than the Sun – can be wrongly placed on the far side of the Sun, resulting in an error of about 15 min.

== Calculation ==
In terms of the vector $\vec{r}$ from the heliocentre to the observer, the unit vector $\hat{n}$ from the observer toward the object or event, and the speed of light $c$:

$$HJD = JD + \frac{\vec{r} \cdot \hat{n}}{c}$$

When the scalar product is expressed in terms of the right ascension $\alpha$ and declination $\delta$ of the Sun (index $\odot$) and of the extrasolar object this becomes:

$$HJD = JD - \frac{r}{c} \cdot [\sin(\delta) \cdot \sin(\delta_{\odot}) + \cos(\delta) \cdot \cos(\delta_{\odot}) \cdot \cos(\alpha - \alpha_{\odot})]$$

where $r$ is the distance between Sun and observer. The same equation can be used with any astronomical coordinate system. In ecliptic coordinates the Sun is at latitude zero, so that

$$HJD = JD - \frac{r}{c} \cdot \cos(\beta) \cdot \cos(\lambda - \lambda_{\odot})$$

== See also ==
- Barycentric Julian Date
- Time standard
