= Gliese 876 c =

Gas giant orbiting Gliese 876

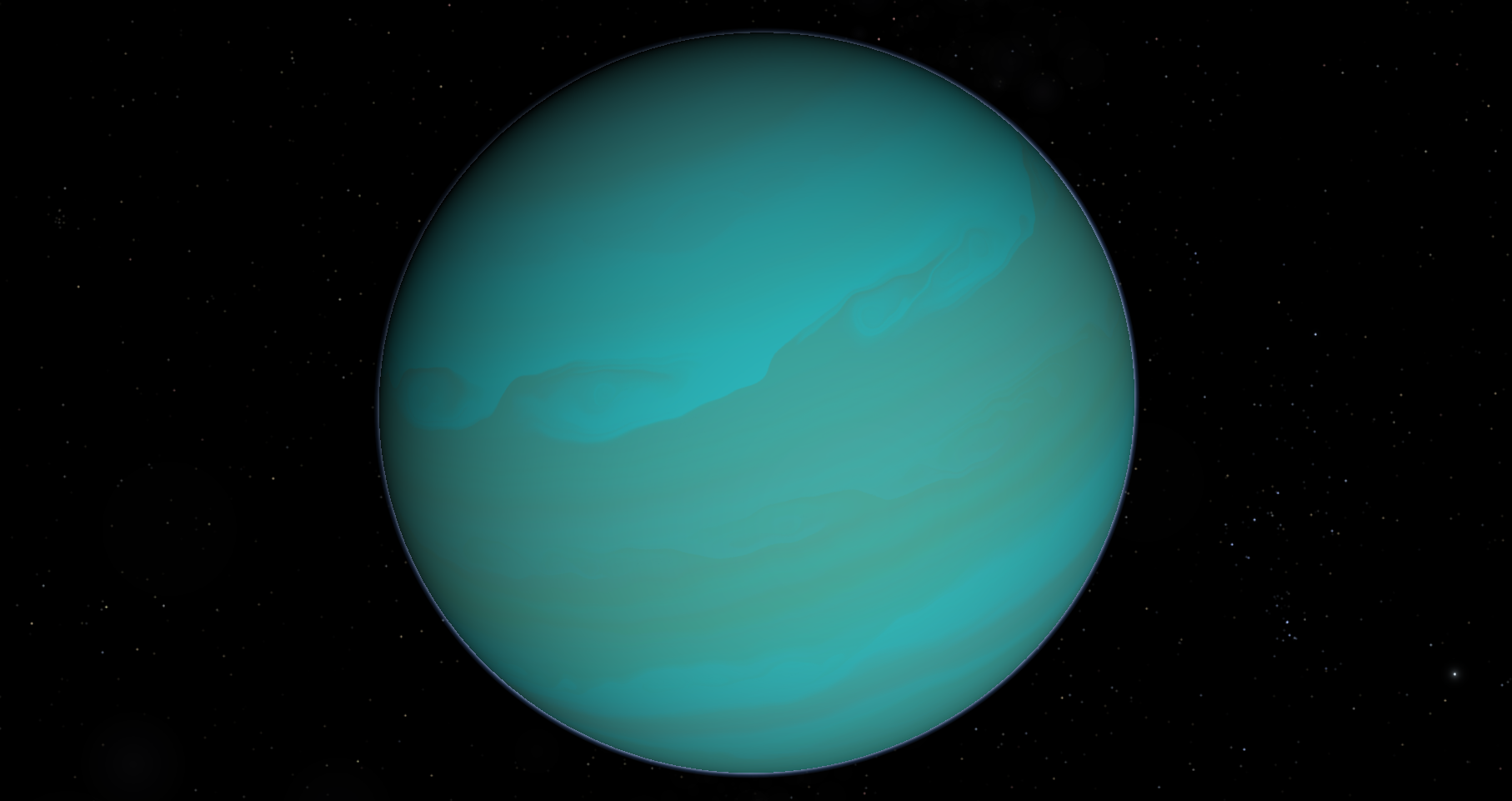
- An artist's impression of Gliese 876 c

Discovery
- Discovered by: California and Carnegie Planet Search Team
- Discovery site: Lick and Keck Observatories
- Discovery date: January 9, 2001
- Detection method: Doppler spectroscopy

Orbital characteristics
- Epoch 2,450,602.09311 BJD
- Semi-major axis: 0.136044+0.000021 −0.000022 AU
- Eccentricity: 0.2571±0.0019
- Orbital period (sidereal): 30.0972+0.0071 −0.0073 d
- Mean anomaly: 292.55+1 −0.99 º
- Inclination: 53.06±0.85 º (Note: The inclination assumes the planets in the system are coplanar, long-term orbital stability simulations strongly favor low mutual inclinations.)
- Argument of perihelion: 51.09+0.77 −0.78 º
- Semi-amplitude: 87.46+0.3 −0.29 m/s
- Star: Gliese 876

Physical characteristics
- Mass: 265.6±2.7 M_{🜨} (Note: Uncertainties in the planetary masses and semimajor axes do not take into account the uncertainty in the mass of the star.)

Gliese 876 c is an exoplanet orbiting the red dwarf Gliese 876, taking about 30 days to complete an orbit. The planet was discovered in April 2001 and is the second planet in order of increasing distance from its star.

== Discovery ==
At the time of discovery, Gliese 876 was already known to host an extrasolar planet designated Gliese 876 b. On January 9, 2001, it was announced that further analysis of the star's radial velocity had revealed the existence of a second planet in the system, which was designated Gliese 876 c. The orbital period of Gliese 876 c was found to be exactly half that of the outer planet, which meant that the radial velocity signature of the second planet was initially interpreted as a higher eccentricity of the orbit of Gliese 876 b.

== Host star ==
The planet orbits a (M-type) star named Gliese 876. The star has a mass of 0.33 M_{☉} and a radius of around 0.36 R_{☉}. It has a surface temperature of 3350 K and is 2.55 billion years old. In comparison, the Sun is about 4.6 billion years old and has a surface temperature of 5778 K.

== Orbit and mass ==
The orbits of the planets of Gliese 876. Gliese 876 c is the second planet from the star Gliese 876.

Gliese 876 c is in a 1:2:4 Laplace resonance with the outer planets Gliese 876 b and Gliese 876 e: for every orbit of planet e, planet b completes two orbits and planet c completes four. This leads to strong gravitational interactions between the planets, causing the orbital elements to change rapidly as the orbits precess. This is the second known example of a Laplace resonance, the first being Jupiter's moons Io, Europa and Ganymede.

The orbital semimajor axis is only 0.13 AU, around a third of the average distance between Mercury and the Sun, and is more eccentric than the orbit of any of the major planets of the Sun's Solar System. Despite this, it is located in the inner regions of the system's habitable zone, since Gliese 876 is such an intrinsically faint star.

A limitation of the radial velocity method used to detect Gliese 876 c is that only a lower limit on the planet's mass can be obtained. This is because the measured mass value depends on the inclination of the orbit, which is not determined by the radial velocity measurements. However, in a resonant system such as Gliese 876, gravitational interactions between the planets can be used to determine the true masses. Using this method, the inclination of the orbit can be determined, revealing the planet's true mass to be 0.72 times that of Jupiter.

== Characteristics ==
Based on its high mass, Gliese 876 c is likely to be a gas giant with no solid surface. Since it was detected indirectly through its gravitational effects on the star, properties such as its radius, composition, and temperature are unknown. Assuming a composition similar to Jupiter and an environment close to chemical equilibrium, the planet is predicted to have a cloudless upper atmosphere.

Gliese 876 c lies at the inner edge of the system's habitable zone. While the prospects for life on gas giants are unknown, it might be possible for a large moon of the planet to provide a habitable environment. Unfortunately tidal interactions between a hypothetical moon, the planet, and the star could destroy moons massive enough to be habitable over the lifetime of the system. In addition it is unclear whether such moons could form in the first place.

This planet, like b and e, has likely migrated inward.

== See also ==
- Appearance of extrasolar planets
- Eccentric Jupiter
- Gliese 581
- List of nearest stars
