= Gliese 317 b =

Jovian planet orbiting Gliese 317

Discovery
- Discovered by: Johnson et al.
- Discovery site: W. M. Keck, U.S.
- Discovery date: 6 July 2007
- Detection method: Doppler spectroscopy

Orbital characteristics
- Semi-major axis: 1.138±0.013 AU
- Eccentricity: 0.0826+0.0070 −0.0071
- Orbital period (sidereal): 695.69+0.26 −0.25 d
- Inclination: 45+30 −10
- Time of periastron: 2,458,089.4+1.7 −1.6
- Argument of periastron: 11.3+4.8 −4.6
- Semi-amplitude: 71.39+0.56 −0.55
- Star: Gliese 317

Physical characteristics
- Mass: 2.5+0.7 −0.4

Gliese 317 b is an extrasolar planet approximately 50 light-years away in the constellation of Pyxis. The planet was reported in July 2007 to be orbiting the red dwarf star Gliese 317. It is a Jovian planet that orbits at about 95% of the distance between Earth and the Sun. The orbital period is about 1.9 years, corresponding to a slow orbital velocity of 14.82 km/s.

== See also ==
- Gliese 317 c
- Gliese 436 b
