= Gliese 876 =

Star in the constellation Aquarius

- Location of Gliese 876 in Aquarius (red dot)

Observation data Epoch J2000 Equinox ICRS
- Constellation: Aquarius
- Pronunciation: /ˈɡliːzə/
- Right ascension: 22^{h} 53^{m} 16.73258^{s}
- Declination: −14° 15′ 49.3041″
- Apparent magnitude (V): 10.1920(17)

Characteristics
- Spectral type: M4V
- Apparent magnitude (J): 5.934(19)
- Apparent magnitude (H): 5.349(49)
- Apparent magnitude (K): 5.010(21)
- Variable type: BY Draconis

Astrometry
Radial velocity (R_{v})	−2.09±0.15 km/s
Proper motion (μ)	RA: 957.715(41) mas/yr Dec.: −673.601(31) mas/yr
Parallax (π)	214.0380±0.0356 mas
Distance	15.238 ± 0.003 ly (4.6721 ± 0.0008 pc)
Absolute magnitude (M_{V})	+11.81

Details
Mass	0.346±0.007 M_{☉}
Radius	0.372±0.004 R_{☉}
Luminosity	0.01309±0.00011 L_{☉}
Surface gravity (log g)	4.89 cgs
Temperature	3,201+20 −19 K
Metallicity [Fe/H]	+0.19±0.17 dex
Rotation	51.39±0.42 days
Rotational velocity (v sin i)	0.16 km/s
Age	0.1–9.9 Gyr

Other designations
- IL Aquarii, BD−15°6290, HIP 113020, G 156-057, LHS 530, Ross 780, Gaia DR3 2603090003484152064

Database references
SIMBAD	Gliese 876
- d
- c
- b
- e
Exoplanet Archive	data
ARICNS	data

Gliese 876 is a red dwarf star 15.2 light-years (4.7 parsecs) away from Earth in the constellation of Aquarius. It is one of the closest known stars to the Sun confirmed to possess a planetary system with more than three planets, the closest of which is Barnard's Star which is 6 ly away; as of 2018, four extrasolar planets have been found to orbit the star. The planetary system is also notable for the orbital properties of its planets. It is the only known system of orbital companions to exhibit a near-triple conjunction in the rare phenomenon of Laplace resonance (a type of resonance first noted in Jupiter's inner three Galilean moons). It is also the first extrasolar system around a normal star with measured coplanarity. While planets b and c are located in the system's habitable zone, they are giant planets believed to be analogous to Jupiter.

== Distance and visibility ==
Gliese 876 is located fairly close to the Solar System. According to astrometric measurements made by the Gaia spacecraft, the star shows a parallax of 214.038 milliarcseconds, which corresponds to a distance of 4.6721 parsecs (15.238 ly). Despite being located so close to Earth, the star is so faint that it is invisible to the naked eye and can only be seen using a telescope.

== Stellar characteristics ==
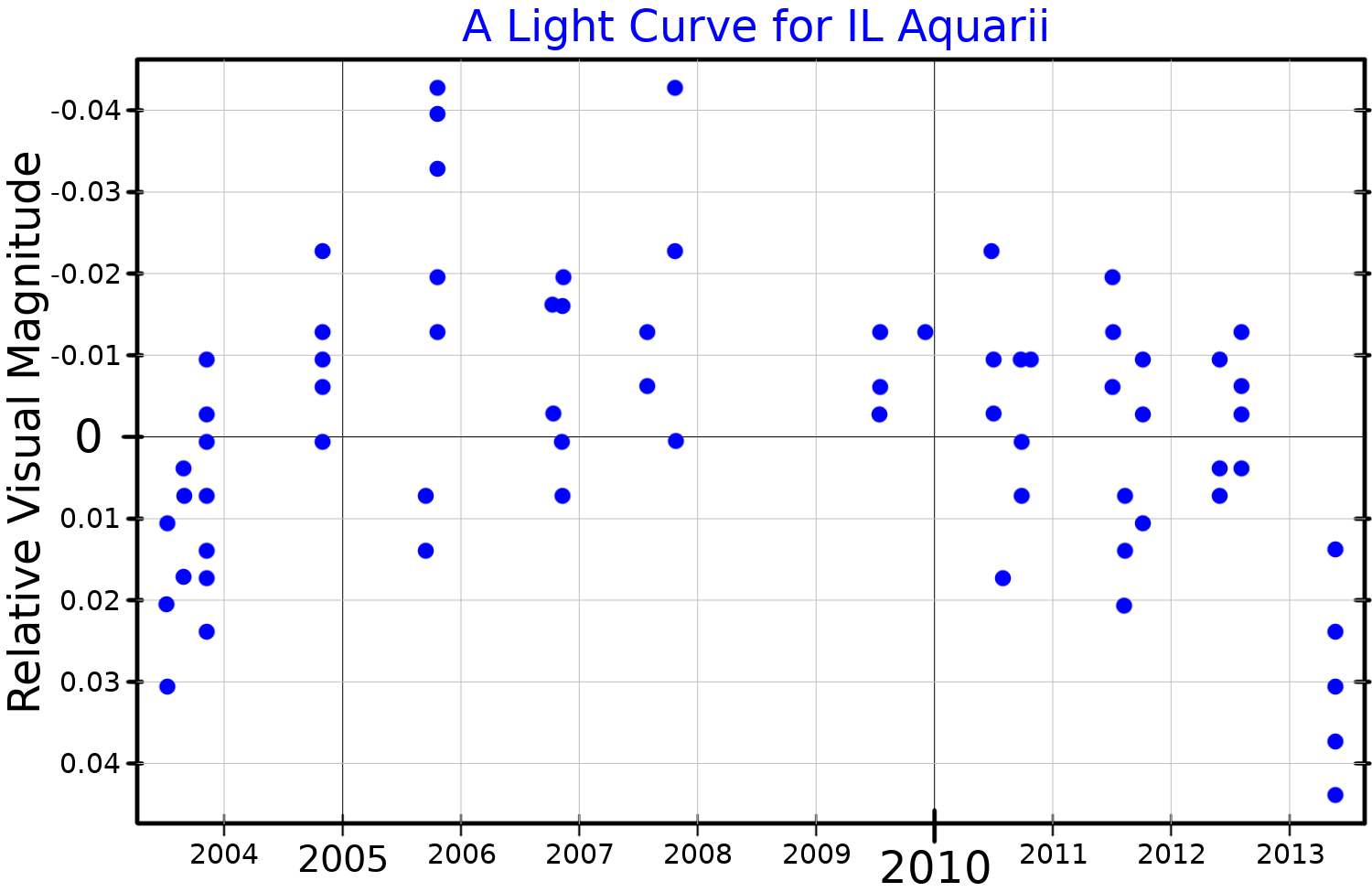
A visual band light curve for IL Aquarii, adapted from Hosey et al. (2015)

As a red dwarf, Gliese 876 is much less massive than the Sun: estimates suggest it has only 35% of the mass of the Sun. The surface temperature of Gliese 876 is cooler than the Sun and the star has a smaller radius. These factors combine to make the star only 1.3% as luminous as the Sun, and most of this is at infrared wavelengths. Estimating the age and metallicity of cool stars is difficult due to the formation of diatomic molecules in their atmospheres, which makes the spectrum extremely complex. By fitting the observed spectrum to model spectra, it is estimated that Gliese 876 has a slightly lower abundance of heavy elements compared to the Sun (around 75% the solar abundance of iron). Based on chromospheric activity the star is likely to be around 6.5 to 9.9 billion years old, depending on the theoretical model used. However, its membership among the young disk population suggest that the star is less than 5 billion years old but the long rotational period of the star implies that it is at least older than 100 million years. Like many low-mass stars, Gliese 876 is a variable star, classified as a BY Draconis variable. Its brightness fluctuates by around 0.04 magnitudes. This type of variability is thought to be caused by large starspots moving in and out of view as the star rotates. Gliese 876 emits X-rays, as most Red Dwarfs do.

The variability of the star's brightness was first detected by Edward W. Weis. It was given its variable star designation, IL Aquarii, in 1997.

== Planetary system ==
=== Observation history ===
The orbits of the planets of Gliese 876. Note that the strong gravitational interactions between the planets causes rapid orbital precession, so this diagram is only valid at the stated epoch.

On June 23, 1998, an extrasolar planet was announced in orbit around Gliese 876 by two independent teams led by Geoffrey Marcy and Xavier Delfosse. The planet was designated Gliese 876 b and was detected by Doppler spectroscopy. Based on luminosity measurement, the circumstellar habitable zone (CHZ) is believed to be located between 0.116 and 0.227 AU. On January 9, 2001, a second planet designated Gliese 876 c was detected, inside the orbit of the previously-discovered planet. The relationship between the orbital periods initially disguised the planet's radial velocity signature as an increased orbital eccentricity of the outer planet. Eugenio Rivera and Jack Lissauer found that the two planets undergo strong gravitational interactions as they orbit the star, causing the orbital elements to change rapidly. On June 13, 2005, further observations by a team led by Rivera revealed a third planet, designated Gliese 876 d inside the orbits of the two Jupiter-size planets. In January 2009, the mutual inclination between planets b and c was determined using a combination of radial velocity and astrometric measurements. The planets were found to be almost coplanar, with an angle of only 5.0^{+3.9}_{−2.3}° between their orbital planes.

On June 23, 2010, astronomers announced a fourth planet, designated Gliese 876 e. This discovery better constrained the mass and orbital properties of the other three planets, including the high eccentricity of the innermost planet. This also filled out the system inside e's orbit; additional planets there would be unstable at this system's age. In 2014, reanalysis of the existing radial velocities suggested the possible presence of two additional planets, which would have almost the same mass as Gliese 876 d, but further analysis showed that these signals were artifacts of dynamical interactions between the known planets. In 2018 a study using hundreds of new radial velocity measurements found no evidence for any additional planets. If this system has a comet disc, it is not "brighter than the fractional dust luminosity 10^{−5}" according to a 2012 Herschel study. None of these planets transit the star from the perspective of Earth, making it difficult to study their properties.

GJ 876 is a candidate parent system for the ʻOumuamua object. The trajectory of this interstellar object took it near the star about 820,000 years ago with a velocity of 5 km/s, after which it has been perturbed by six other stars.

=== Orbital arrangement ===
Gliese 876 has a notable orbital arrangement. It is the first planetary system around a normal star to have mutual inclination between planets measured without transits (previously the mutual inclination of the planets orbiting the pulsar PSR B1257+12 had been determined by measuring their gravitational interactions). Later measurements reduced the value of the mutual inclination, and in the latest four-planet models the incorporation mutual inclinations does not result in significant improvements relative to coplanar solutions. The system has the second known example of a Laplace resonance with a 1:2:4 resonance of its planets. The first known example was Jupiter's closest Galilean moons – Ganymede, Europa and Io. Numerical integration indicates that the coplanar, four-planet system is stable for at least another billion years. This planetary system comes close to a triple conjunction between the three outer planets once per orbit of the outermost planet.

=== Planets ===
The outermost three of the known planets likely formed further away from the star, and migrated inward.

The Gliese 876 planetary system (Note: Uncertainties in the planetary masses and semimajor axes do not take into account the uncertainty in the mass of the star.)
Companion (in order from star)	Mass	Semimajor axis (AU)	Orbital period (days)	Eccentricity	Inclination (°)	Radius
d	6.68±0.22 M_{🜨}	0.021020525	1.9377904+0.0000064 −0.0000073	0.035+0.033 −0.024	56.7±1.0	—
c	0.740±0.008 M_{J}	0.130874+0.00002 −0.000019	30.1039+0.0069 −0.0066	0.257+0.0018 −0.0019	56.7±1.0	—
b	2.357±0.027 M_{J}	0.209805+0.000014 −0.000016	61.1035+0.0062 −0.0069	0.0296+0.003 −0.0013	56.7±1.0	—
e	16.0±1.0 M_{🜨}	0.3355+0.0019 −0.0011	123.55+1.0 −0.59	0.0545+0.0069 −0.022	56.7±1.0	—

Gliese 876 d

Gliese 876 d, discovered in 2005, is the innermost known planet. With an estimated mass 6.7 times that of the Earth, it is possible that it is a dense terrestrial planet.

Gliese 876 c

Gliese 876 c, discovered in 2001, is a 0.74 Jupiter-mass giant planet. It is in a 1:2 orbital resonance with the planet b, taking 30.104 days to orbit the star. The planet orbits within the habitable zone. Its temperature makes it more likely to be a Class III planet in the Sudarsky extrasolar planet classification. The presence of surface liquid water and life is possible on sufficiently massive satellites should they exist.

Gliese 876 b

Gliese 876 b, discovered in 1998, is around twice the mass of Jupiter and revolves around its star in an orbit taking 61.104 days to complete, at a distance of only 0.21 AU, less than the distance from the Sun to Mercury. Its temperature makes it more likely to be a Class II or Class III planet in the Sudarsky model. The presence of surface liquid water and life is possible on sufficiently massive satellites should they exist.

Gliese 876 e

Gliese 876 e, discovered in 2010, has a mass similar to that of the planet Uranus and its orbit takes 124 days to complete.

== See also ==
- List of nearest stars and brown dwarfs
- Gliese 581
- Lists of exoplanets
- List of exoplanets discovered before 2000 - Gliese 876 b
