= Gliese 317 =

Star in the constellation Pyxis

Observation data Epoch J2000.0 Equinox ICRS
- Constellation: Pyxis
- Right ascension: 08^{h} 40^{m} 59.2056^{s}
- Declination: −23° 27′ 22.599″
- Apparent magnitude (V): 11.98

Characteristics
- Evolutionary stage: main sequence
- Spectral type: M2.5V
- V−R color index: 0.338

Astrometry
Radial velocity (R_{v})	87.8 km/s
Proper motion (μ)	RA: −461.162±0.139 mas/yr Dec.: 805.571±0.126 mas/yr
Parallax (π)	65.7744±0.0557 mas
Distance	49.59 ± 0.04 ly (15.20 ± 0.01 pc)
Absolute magnitude (M_{V})	11.06±0.04

Details
Mass	0.42±0.05 M_{☉}
Radius	0.4170±0.0013 R_{☉}
Luminosity	0.02175±0.00034 L_{☉}
Temperature	3,510±50 K
Metallicity [Fe/H]	+0.3 dex
Rotation	69 days
Age	~5 Gyr

Other designations
- GJ 317, LFT 538, LHS 2037, LPM 296, LTT 3215

Database references
SIMBAD	data
Exoplanet Archive	data

Gliese 317 is a small red dwarf star with two exoplanet companions in the southern constellation of Pyxis. It is located at a distance of 49.6 light-years from the Sun based on parallax measurements, and is drifting further away with a radial velocity of +87.8 km/s. This star is too faint to be viewed with the naked eye, having an apparent visual magnitude of 11.98 and an absolute magnitude of 11.06.

This is an M-type main-sequence star with a stellar classification of M2.5V. Photometric calibrations and infrared spectroscopic measurements indicate that the star is enriched in heavy elements compared to the Sun. The star is estimated to be roughly five billion years old and has a low activity level for a star of its class. It has 42% of the mass and radius of the Sun and is spinning with a rotation period of 69 days. The star is radiating 2.2% of the Sun's luminosity from its photosphere at an effective temperature of 3,510 K.

== Planetary system ==
In 2007, a jovian planet (designated Gliese 317 b) was announced to orbit the star. The planet orbits about 95% the distance between Earth to the Sun. Despite this, it takes about 1.9 years, due to the lower mass of the central M dwarf. Astrometric measurements on Gliese 317 provided a significant update to the distance, putting the star at 15.3 pc, which is 65% further out than previously assumed. Using mass-luminosity calibrations, the new distance implies the star is significantly more massive and so are the planet candidates. The same astrometric measurements allowed to constrain the orbital inclination and put an upper limit to the mass of Gliese 317 b (98% confidence level) of 2.5 M_{J}.

The second planet in the system was also confirmed with the additional new RV measurements, but the period and orbital parameters of Gliese 317 c were very uncertain (P>2000 days). A stability analysis on this putative system suggest that the pair of gas giant planets are in a 4:1 mean motion resonance. The second planet, remote from its host star, is a good candidate for direct imaging. Revised elements of this companion were presented in 2020, demonstrating this is a Jupiter analog.

The Gliese 317 planetary system
Companion (in order from star)	Mass	Semimajor axis (AU)	Orbital period (days)	Eccentricity	Inclination (°)	Radius
b	≥1.688±0.041 M_{J}	1.138±0.013	695.69^{+0.26}_{−0.25}	0.0826^{+0.0070}_{−0.0071}	—	—
c	≥1.430^{+0.058}_{−0.055} M_{J}	5.04±0.10	6,500±170	0.217±0.014	—	—

== See also ==
- Gliese 649
- Gliese 849
- HD 108874
- List of exoplanets discovered between 2000–2009 - Gliese 317 b
- List of exoplanets discovered in 2020 - Gliese 317 c
