= Gliese 849 =

Star in the constellation Aquarius

Observation data Epoch J2000.0 Equinox ICRS
- Constellation: Aquarius
- Right ascension: 22^{h} 09^{m} 40.34431^{s}
- Declination: −04° 38′ 26.6508″
- Apparent magnitude (V): 10.41

Characteristics
- Evolutionary stage: Main sequence
- Spectral type: M3.5V
- U−B color index: 1.055
- B−V color index: 1.531±0.035
- V−R color index: 1.12
- R−I color index: 1.41

Astrometry
Radial velocity (R_{v})	−15.26±0.10 km/s
Proper motion (μ)	RA: 1,132.583(39) mas/yr Dec.: −22.157(37) mas/yr
Parallax (π)	113.4447±0.0300 mas
Distance	28.750 ± 0.008 ly (8.815 ± 0.002 pc)
Absolute magnitude (M_{V})	10.62

Details
Mass	0.465±0.011 M_{☉}
Radius	0.464±0.018 R_{☉}
Luminosity	0.02887±0.00025 L_{☉}
Surface gravity (log g)	4.771±0.032 cgs
Temperature	3,467±68 K
Metallicity [Fe/H]	0.09±0.09 dex
Rotation	40.45+0.19 −0.18 d
Rotational velocity (v sin i)	2.4 km/s

Other designations
- BD−05°5715, GJ 849, HIP 109388, LFT 1689, LHS 517, LPM 814, LTT 8889, NLTT 53078, Wolf 1329, GCRV 13921, 2MASS J22094029-0438267

Database references
SIMBAD	The star
- planet b
- planet c
Exoplanet Archive	data
ARICNS	data

Gliese 849, or GJ 849, is a small, solitary star in the equatorial constellation of Aquarius. It has a reddish hue and is invisible to the naked eye with an apparent visual magnitude of 10.41. The distance to this star is 28.8 light-years (8.8 parsecs) based on parallax, but it is drifting closer to the Sun with a radial velocity of −15.3 km/s. It has a pair of confirmed gas giant companions.

The stellar classification of GJ 849 is M3.5V, which means this is a small red dwarf star generating energy through hydrogen fusion at its core region. Various studies have found super-solar abundances in the spectra, indicating that the elemental abundances of higher mass elements is significantly higher than in the Sun. The star has about half the mass and size of the Sun, and is spinning slowly with a rotation period of approximately 39 days. The estimated age of the star is more than three billion years. It is radiating a mere 2.9% of the luminosity of the Sun from its photosphere at an effective temperature of 3,490 K.

== Planetary system ==
In late 2006, a long-period Jupiter-like exoplanet was reported to be orbiting the red dwarf in a period just over 5 years in length. There was also a linear trend in the radial velocities which suggested another longer period companion. The trend in the radial velocities was confirmed in 2013. An orbit for the second exoplanet was finally determined in 2015. The first planet discovered, Gliese 849 b, was the first planet discovered orbiting a red dwarf with a semi-major axis greater than 0.21 AU.

The Gliese 849 planetary system
Companion (in order from star)	Mass	Semimajor axis (AU)	Orbital period (days)	Eccentricity	Inclination (°)	Radius
b	≥0.893+0.094 −0.097 M_{J}	2.32+0.11 −0.13	1925.31±6.5	0.029±0.019	—	—
c	≥0.99±0.11 M_{J}	4.95+0.25 −0.28	5990+110 −100	0.092+0.038 −0.036	—	—

== See also ==
- List of star systems within 25–30 light-years
- Gliese 317
- Gliese 649
- Gliese 581
- List of extrasolar planets
