= Gliese 876 b =

Extrasolar planet orbiting Gliese 876

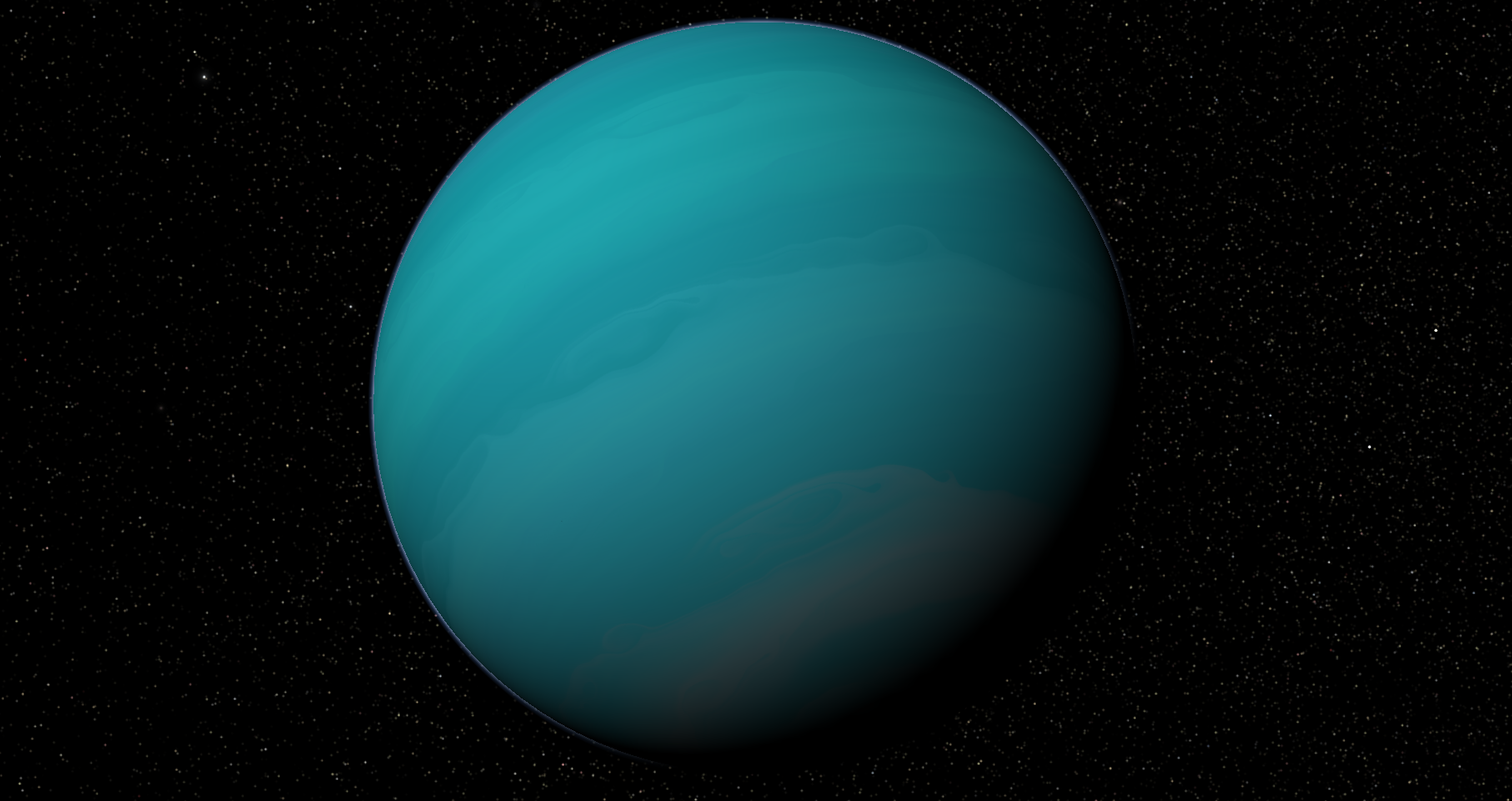
- An artist's impression of Gliese 876 b

Discovery
- Discovered by: California and Carnegie Planet Search Team and independently by the Geneva Extrasolar Planet Search Team
- Discovery site: Lick, Keck, Haute-Provence and La Silla Observatories
- Discovery date: June 22, 1998
- Detection method: Doppler spectroscopy

Orbital characteristics
- Epoch 2,450,602.09311 BJD
- Semi-major axis: 0.218627±0.000017 AU
- Eccentricity: 0.0325+0.0016 −0.0017
- Orbital period (sidereal): 61.1057±0.0074 d
- Mean anomaly: 340.6+4.4 −4 º
- Inclination: 53.06±0.85 º (Note: The inclination assumes the planets in the system are coplanar, long-term orbital stability simulations strongly favor low mutual inclinations.)
- Argument of perihelion: 35.5+4.1 −4.4 º
- Semi-amplitude: 211.57+0.3 −0.29 m/s
- Star: Gliese 876

Physical characteristics
- Mass: 845.2+9.5 −9.4 M_{🜨} (Note: Uncertainties in the planetary masses and semimajor axes do not take into account the uncertainty in the mass of the star.)
- Temperature: 194 K (−79 °C; −110 °F)

Gliese 876 b is an exoplanet orbiting the red dwarf Gliese 876. It completes one orbit in approximately 61 days. Discovered in June 1998, Gliese 876 b was the first planet to be discovered orbiting a red dwarf.

== Discovery ==
Gliese 876 b was initially announced by Geoffrey Marcy on June 22, 1998, at a symposium of the International Astronomical Union in Victoria, British Columbia, Canada. The discovery was made using data from the Keck and Lick observatories. Only 2 hours after his announcement, he was shown an e-mail from the Geneva Extrasolar Planet Search team confirming the planet. The Geneva team used telescopes at the Haute-Provence Observatory in France and the European Southern Observatory in La Serena, Chile. Like the majority of early extrasolar planet discoveries it was discovered by detecting variations in its star's radial velocity as a result of the planet's gravity. This was done by making sensitive measurements of the Doppler shift of the spectral lines of Gliese 876. It was the first discovered of four known planets in the Gliese 876 system.

== Characteristics ==
=== Mass, radius, and temperature ===
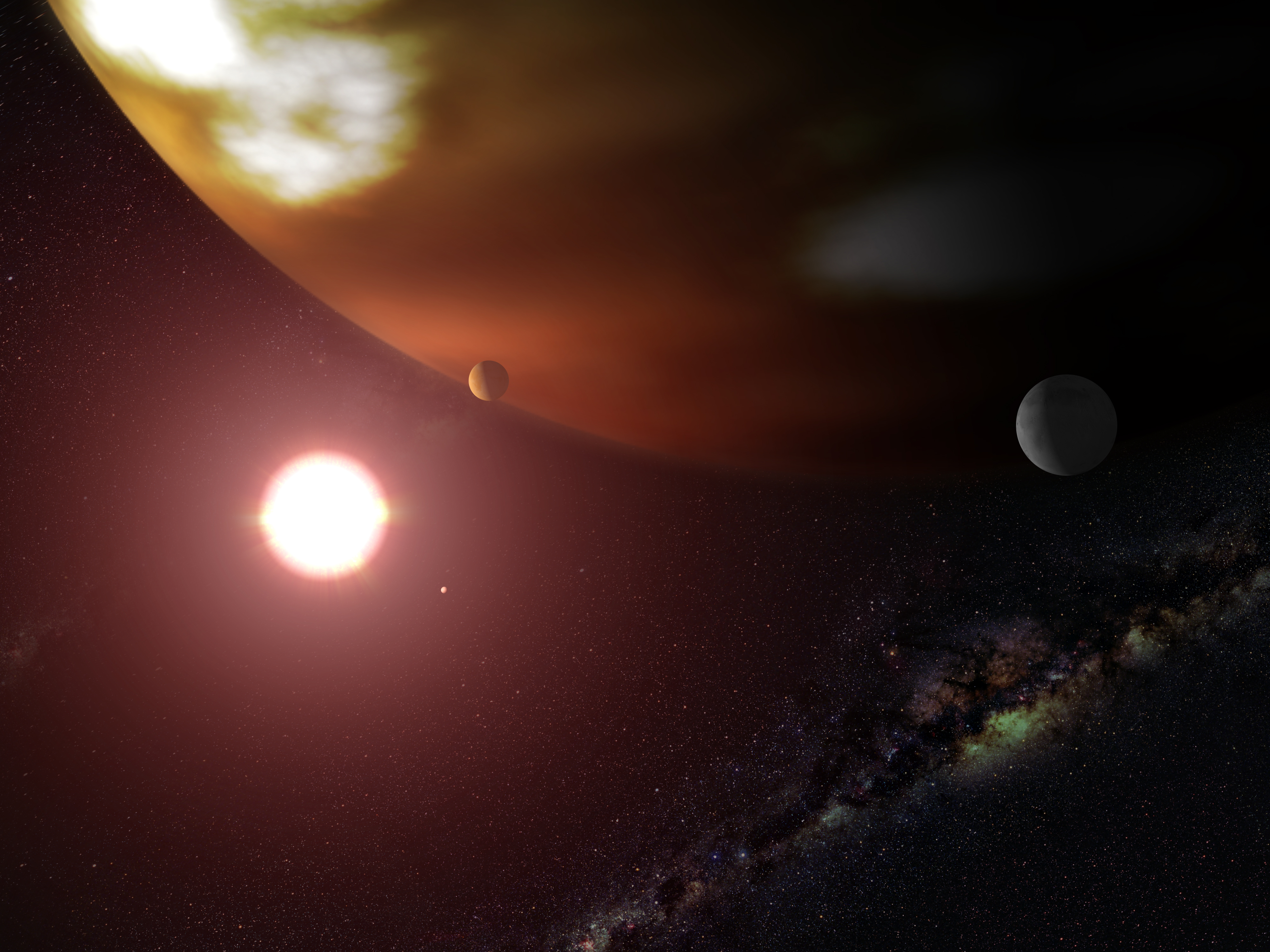
An artist's impression of Gliese 876 b as an enormous Jupiter-like planet with a hypothetical satellite system.

Given the planet's high mass, it is likely that Gliese 876 b is a gas giant with no solid surface. Since the planet has only been detected indirectly through its gravitational effects on the star, properties such as its radius, composition, and temperature are unknown. Assuming a composition similar to Jupiter and an environment close to chemical equilibrium, it is predicted that the atmosphere of Gliese 876 b is cloudless, though cooler regions of the planet may be able to form water clouds.

A limitation of the radial velocity method used to detect Gliese 876 b is that only a lower limit on the planet's mass can be obtained. This lower limit is around 1.93 times the mass of Jupiter. The true mass depends on the inclination of the orbit, which in general is unknown. However, because Gliese 876 is only 15 light years from Earth Benedict et al. (2002) were able to use one of the Fine Guidance Sensors on the Hubble Space Telescope to detect the astrometric wobble created by Gliese 876 b. This constituted the first unambiguous astrometric detection of an extrasolar planet. Their analysis suggested that the orbital inclination is 84°±6° (close to edge-on). In the case of Gliese 876 b, modelling the planet-planet interactions from the Laplace resonance shows that the actual inclination of the orbit is 59°, resulting in a true mass of 2.2756 times the mass of Jupiter.

The equilibrium temperature of Gliese 876 b, is estimated to be around 194 K (−79 °C; −110 °F).

This planet, like c and e, has likely migrated inward.

=== Host star ===
The planet orbits a (M-type) star named Gliese 876. The star has a mass of 0.33 M_{☉} and a radius of around 0.36 R_{☉}. It has a surface temperature of 3350 K and is 2.55 billion years old. In comparison, the Sun is about 4.6 billion years old and has a surface temperature of 5778 K.

=== Orbit ===
The orbits of the planets of Gliese 876. Gliese 876 b is the third planet from the star.

Gliese 876 b is in a 1:2:4 Laplace resonance with the inner planet Gliese 876 c and the outer planet Gliese 876 e: in the time it takes planet e to complete one orbit, planet b completes two and planet c completes four. This is the second known example of a Laplace resonance, the first being Jupiter's moons Io, Europa and Ganymede. As a result, the orbital elements of the planets change fairly rapidly as they dynamically interact with one another. The planet's orbit has a low eccentricity, similar to the planets in the Solar System. The semimajor axis of the orbit is only 0.208 AU, less than that of Mercury in the Solar System. However Gliese 876 is such a faint star that this puts it in the outer part of the habitable zone.

Models of tidal interactions between a hypothetical moon, the planet and the star suggest that large moons should be able to survive in orbit around Gliese 876 b for the lifetime of the system.

== See also ==
- Appearance of extrasolar planets
- List of exoplanets discovered before 2000
