= HD 13931 =

Star in constellation Andromeda

Observation data Epoch J2000.0 Equinox ICRS
- Constellation: Andromeda
- Right ascension: 02^{h} 16^{m} 47.37872^{s}
- Declination: +43° 46′ 22.7862″
- Apparent magnitude (V): 7.60

Characteristics
- Spectral type: G0V
- Apparent magnitude (B): 8.237
- Apparent magnitude (R): 7.2
- Apparent magnitude (I): 6.9
- Apparent magnitude (J): 6.452
- Apparent magnitude (H): 6.234
- Apparent magnitude (K): 6.139
- B−V color index: 0.640
- R−I color index: 0.3

Astrometry
Radial velocity (R_{v})	30.65±0.13 km/s
Proper motion (μ)	RA: 98.570±0.028 mas/yr Dec.: −183.408±0.030 mas/yr
Parallax (π)	21.1877±0.0251 mas
Distance	153.9 ± 0.2 ly (47.20 ± 0.06 pc)
Absolute magnitude (M_{V})	4.32±0.10

Details
Mass	1.04±0.01 M_{☉}
Radius	1.18±0.02 R_{☉}
Luminosity	1.49±0.01 L_{☉}
Surface gravity (log g)	4.3±0.03 cgs
Temperature	5868±24 K
Metallicity	+0.03±0.04
Rotation	~26 days
Age	6.8±0.6 Gyr

Other designations
- BD+43°459, HD 13931, HIP 10626, SAO 37918, PPM 44946, LTT 10766, NLTT 7491

Database references
SIMBAD	data
Exoplanet Archive	data

HD 13931 is a Sun-like star in the northern constellation of Andromeda. It can be viewed with binoculars or a small telescope but is too faint to be seen with the naked eye, having an apparent visual magnitude of 7.60. This object is located at a distance of 154 light years from the Sun, as determined from its parallax, and is drifting further away with a radial velocity of +31 km/s.

This is an ordinary G-type main-sequence star with a stellar classification of G0V, which indicates it, like the Sun, is generating energy through core hydrogen fusion. It is slightly larger, hotter, brighter, and more massive than the Sun. The metal content is about 8% greater than the Sun, and it has a quiet (magnetically inactive) chromosphere. The star is an estimated 6.8 billion years old and it is spinning with a rotation period of about 26 days

In 2009, a very long-period giant planet, more massive than Jupiter, was found in orbit around the star by measuring changes in the star's radial velocity. This planet takes 12.16 years to orbit the star at the typical distance of 5.32 AU (796 Gm). The planet's eccentricity (0.02) is about the same as Earth's. In 2023, the inclination and true mass of HD 13931 b were measured via astrometry.

According to a 2018 research, HD 13931 is the most promising Solar System analogue known, since it has a star similar to the Sun and a planet with mass and semimajor axis similar to Jupiter. Those characteristics yield a probability almost 75% for the existence of a dynamically stable habitable zone, where an Earth-like planet may exist and sustain life.

The HD 13931 planetary system
Companion (in order from star)	Mass	Semimajor axis (AU)	Orbital period (days)	Eccentricity	Inclination (°)	Radius
b	2.8+0.8 −0.6 M_{J}	5.32±0.09	4,442+49 −46	0.02±0.02	100+50 −60	—

== See also ==
- List of extrasolar planets
