= HD 24496 =

Binary star system in the constellation Taurus

Observation data Epoch J2000.0 Equinox ICRS
- Constellation: Taurus
- Right ascension: 03^{h} 54^{m} 28.03326^{s}
- Declination: +16° 36′ 57.7897″
- Apparent magnitude (V): 6.81 (6.9 + 11.1)

Characteristics
- Spectral type: G7V + M2V
- Apparent magnitude (B): 7.529
- Apparent magnitude (R): 6.40
- Apparent magnitude (I): 6.000
- Apparent magnitude (J): 5.384±0.024
- Apparent magnitude (H): 5.102±0.026
- Apparent magnitude (K): 4.995±0.017
- B−V color index: 0.719±0.001

Astrometry
Radial velocity (R_{v})	+18.99±0.09 km/s
Proper motion (μ)	RA: +214.191 mas/yr Dec.: −167.336 mas/yr
Parallax (π)	48.8107±0.0474 mas
Distance	66.82 ± 0.06 ly (20.49 ± 0.02 pc)
Absolute magnitude (M_{V})	5.26

Orbit
Primary	A
Name	B
Period (P)	589+57 −84 years
Semi-major axis (a)	80.2+4.6 −7.8 au
Eccentricity (e)	0.099+0.130 −0.054
Inclination (i)	117.11+2.90 −0.91°
Longitude of the node (Ω)	38.7+1.2 −1.4°
Periastron epoch (T)	JD = 2577107+8299 −10043
Argument of periastron (ω) (secondary)	318+13 −32°

Details

A
Mass	0.941±0.053 M_{☉}
Radius	0.91±0.03 R_{☉}
Luminosity	0.705+0.073 −0.076 L_{☉}
Surface gravity (log g)	4.52+0.03 −0.04 cgs
Temperature	5,572±44 K
Metallicity [Fe/H]	−0.01±0.03 dex
Rotational velocity (v sin i)	0.0±0.5 km/s
Age	3.316+3.88 −3.16 Gyr

B
Mass	0.5389+0.0082 −0.0081 M_{☉}

Other designations
- BD+16°527, GC 4699, GJ 3255, HD 24496, HIP 18267, SAO 93662, PPM 119451, WDS J03545+1637, LTT 11292, NLTT 12133

Database references
SIMBAD	data
- B

HD 24496 is a binary star system in the equatorial constellation of Taurus. The combined apparent visual magnitude of the pair is 6.81, which is too faint to be readily visible to the normal human eye. The system is located at a distance of 66.8 light-years from the Sun, based on parallax, and is drifting further away with a radial velocity of +19 km/s. It is traversing the celestial sphere with a proper motion of 0.276″ per year.

The magnitude 6.9 primary star, designated component A, is a G-type main-sequence star with a stellar classification of G7V. It is around three billion years old with a low projected rotational velocity. The star has 96% of the mass of the Sun and 91% of the Sun's radius. The metallicity, what astronomers term the abundance of heavier elements, is about the same as in the Sun. The star is radiating 71% of the luminosity of the Sun from its photosphere at an effective temperature of 5,572 K.

The secondary companion, component B, is of magnitude 11.1 red dwarf of class M2V that shares a common proper motion with the primary. They have an orbital separation of 80 astronomical units, taking 590 years to complete an orbit around their centre of mass.
