= Barycentric Julian Date =

Julian date corrected for the barycenter of the Solar System

The Barycentric Julian Date (BJD) is the Julian Date (JD) corrected for differences in the Earth's position with respect to the barycentre of the Solar System. Due to the finite speed of light, the time an astronomical event is observed depends on the changing position of the observer in the Solar System. Before multiple observations can be combined, they must be reduced to a common, fixed, reference location. This correction also depends on the direction to the object or event being timed.

In 1991, the BJD replaced the Heliocentric Julian Date (HJD), which reduced times to the centre of the Sun, which itself orbits the barycentre. The difference between HJD and BJD is up to ±4 s.

== Magnitude of the correction ==
The correction is small for objects at the poles of the ecliptic. Elsewhere, it is approximately an annual sine curve, and the highest amplitude occurs on the ecliptic. The maximum correction corresponds to the time in which light travels the distance from the barycentre to the Earth, i.e. ±8.3 min (500 s, 0.0058 days).

== Time Standard ==
JD and BJD are defined independent of the time standard. JD can be expressed as e.g. UTC, TT, TAI, TDB, etc. The differences between these time standards are of the order of a minute, so for better than one-minute accuracy, the time standard must be stated. While many quote the BJD in UTC, UTC is discontinuous and drifts with the addition of each leap second, and should therefore only be used for relative timing over a short time span (~1 year). For high-precision, absolute timing, TDB should be used. However, applications for which ±1.7 ms precision is sufficient may use TT to approximate TDB, which is much easier to calculate.

== Calculation ==
=== Exact expression ===
Neglecting effects of special and general relativity, the correction of Terrestrial Time (TT) is

$$BJD_{TT} = JD_{TT} + \frac{|\vec{r} + d \, \hat{n}| - d}{c}$$

where $\vec{r}$ is the vector from the barycentre to the observer, $\hat{n}$ is the unit vector from the observer to the object or event, $d$ is the distance from the observer to the observed object or event, and $c$ is the speed of light.

This expression should be used for objects within the Solar System.

=== Expression for infinite distance ===
In the limit of infinite distance to the object, the exact expression becomes

$$BJD_{TT} = JD_{TT} + \frac{\vec{r} \cdot \hat{n}}{c}$$

This expression should be used for objects beyond the Solar System. The error is at the level of 100 s for objects in the main asteroid belt, 5 s for Edgeworth-Kuiper Belt objects. At the distance of Proxima Centauri the accuracy is 1 ms.

=== Approximation for large distance ===
Due to the limited precision with which floating point numbers are stored in computers, the exact expression is in practice not accurate for large distances. The approximation

$$BJD_{TT} = JD_{TT} + \frac{\vec{r} \cdot \hat{n}}{c} + \frac{\vec{r} \cdot \vec{r} - (\vec{r} \cdot \hat{n})^2}{2 \, c \, d}$$

is accurate for large distances. It should be used if the object is beyond the Solar System and if also millisecond accuracy is required.

== See also ==
- Heliocentric Julian Date
- Time standard
