= List of nearest terrestrial exoplanet candidates =

This list of nearest terrestrial exoplanet candidates contains possible terrestrial ("rocky") exoplanets spaced at a distance of up to 50 light-years from the Solar System, ordered by increasing distance.

They may be composed primarily of silicate rocks and/or metals. Within the Solar System, the terrestrial planets are the inner planets closest to the Sun.

== Exoplanets discovered (incomplete) ==
This list is incomplete, currently containing 34 exoplanets, 11 of which probably lie inside their star's habitable zone.

There are roughly 2,000 stars at a distance of up to 50 light-years from the Solar System (64 of them are yellow-orange "G" stars like the Sun). As many as 15% of them could have Earth-sized planets in the habitable zones.

On November 4, 2013, astronomers reported, based on Kepler space mission data, that there could be as many as 40 billion Earth-sized planets orbiting in the habitable zones of Sun-like stars and red dwarf stars within the Milky Way galaxy. Eleven billion of these estimated planets may be orbiting Sun-like stars. The nearest such planet was then as close as 12 light-years away but (see below) is now estimated slightly above four light-years away.

On August 24, 2016, astronomers announced the discovery of a rocky planet in the habitable zone of Proxima Centauri, the closest star to Earth (not counting the Sun). Called Proxima b, the planet is 1.3 times the mass of Earth and has an orbital period of roughly 11.2 Earth days. However, Proxima Centauri's classification as a red dwarf casts doubts on the habitability of any exoplanets in its orbit due to low stellar flux, high probability of tidal locking, small circumstellar habitable zones and high stellar variation. Another likely candidate is Alpha Centauri, Earth's nearest Sun-like star system 4.37 light-years away. Estimates place the probability of finding a habitable planet around Alpha Centauri A or B at roughly 75%. Alpha Centauri is the target of several exoplanet-finding missions, including Breakthrough Starshot and Mission Centaur, the latter of which is chronicled in the 2016 documentary film The Search for Earth Proxima.

In 2023, astronomers used the radial velocity method to confirm that the exoplanet Wolf 1069 b sits in the habitable zone of Wolf 1069. Located 31 light years from Earth, this planet is 1.26 times the mass of Earth and has a radius of 1.08 times the Earth's. Though Wolf 1069 b is likely tidally locked, its daylight side may still be habitable. It has similar characteristics to Proxima Centauri b and is one of the nearest discovered potentially habitable exoplanets to Earth. Wolf 1069 b is likely rocky, with an Earth-like composition, and climate models suggest that it is habitable for a broad range of possible atmospheres although the nature of its true atmosphere is unknown. Characterizing its atmosphere is more difficult than with a transiting exoplanet as transmission spectroscopy is inapplicable, and instruments for alternative techniques such as analysis of thermal emission and reflected light are not yet available. The angular separation between Wolf 1069 b and its star is also small, which further complicates these measurements.

== Data Table ==
Name	M🜨	R🜨	g	Ts	a	e	[s]	D
	Mass (in Earth masses)	Radius (in Earth radii)	Surface gravity (1 – standard Earth gravity)	Surface temperature	Semi-major axis in astronomical units	Orbital eccentricity	Main source	Distance from the Sun in lightyears
Proxima Centauri b	≥1.27	~1.1		234 K -39°C	0.05	<0.35		4.22
Proxima Centauri c	~7			39 K -234 °C	~1.489	~0.04		4.22
Ross 128 b	≥1.40			213 to 301 K -60 to 28 °C				11.03
Luyten b	≥2.89	≥1.35		259 K -14 °C	0.091	0.10		12.20
Teegarden's star-b	~1.16			263K	0.0295			12.6
Teegarden's star-c	~1.05			263K	0.0445			
Wolf 1061c	≥4.3	≥1.64		- -				13.8
Wolf 1061d	≥5.21	≥2.04		- -				13.8
Wolf 1069 b	1.26	1.08		250.1 K -23.1 °C	0.0672			31
Gliese 876 d	6.8			650 K 377 °C	0.021	0.21		15
Gliese 682 b	≥2			- -				16
Gliese 832 c	≥5.4			251 K -22 °C	0.162	0.03		16.16
82 G. Eridani b	≥2.7			660 K 387 °C	0.1207	0		19.71
82 G. Eridani c	≥2.4			508 K 235 °C	0.2036	0		19.71
82 G. Eridani d	≥4.8			388 K 115 °C	0.3499	0		19.71
Gliese 581 e	≥1.7			- -	0.029	0		20
Gliese 581 c	≥5.6			- -	0.072	0		20
Gliese 581 d	≥5.6	2.34	1.27	233 K -41 °C	0.218	0		20
HD 219134 b	4.5	1.6		700 K 427 °C				21
Gliese 667 Cb	6.30		1.44	445 K 172 °C	0.05	0.09		22
Gliese 667 Cc	3.8		1.32	302 K 29 °C	0.13	0.34		22
61 Virginis b	≥5.1			- -	0.050	0.12		28
HD 85512 b	≥3.6	1.74	1.33	351 K 78 °C	0.26	0.11		36
GJ 180 b	≥2.3			312 K 39 °C				38
TRAPPIST-1b				- -				39.5
TRAPPIST-1c				- -				39.5
TRAPPIST-1d	0.48			282.1 K 9 °C				39.5
TRAPPIST-1e				246.1 K -27.1 °C				39.5
TRAPPIST-1f				219 K -54 °C				39.5
TRAPPIST-1g				198.6 K -75 °C				39.5
TRAPPIST-1h				169 K -104 °C				39.5
55 Cancri e (Janssen)	8.6			- -	0.016	0.17		40
HD 40307 b	≥4.2			- -	0.047	0.2		42
HD 40307 c	≥6.8			- -	0.081	0.06		42
HD 40307 d	≥9.2			- -	0.134	0.07		42
HD 40307 e	≥3.5			- -	0.1886	0.15		42
HD 40307 f	≥5.2			385 K 112 °C	0.247	0.02		42
HD 40307 g	≥7.1			284 K 11 °C	0.600	0.29		42

Note: There is no scientific consensus about terrestrial composition of most of the planets in the list. Sources in the "Main source" column confirm the possibility of terrestrial composition.

In September 2012, the discovery of two planets orbiting Gliese 163 was announced. One of the planets, Gliese 163 c, about 6.9 times the mass of Earth and somewhat hotter, was considered to be within the habitable zone, but is probably not terrestrial.

In May 2016, the finding of three Earth-like planets of ultracool dwarf TRAPPIST-1 has been released.

The existence of the planet Gliese 832 c was refuted in 2022, when a study found that the radial velocity signal shows characteristics of a signal originating from stellar activity, and not from a planet.

== Statistics ==
Distance from the Solar System
Distance	Lying within the habitable zone	All
< 10 light-years	0 (2?)	2
< 20 light-years	6	15
< 30 light-years	8	22
< 40 light-years	10	24
< 50 light-years	11	31

Note: in most cases, the composition of the atmosphere and the atmospheric pressure of exoplanets is unknown, so surface temperatures are estimates based on computer models and expert opinions.

== See also ==
- Interstellar travel
- List of multiplanetary systems
- List of nearest exoplanets
- List of nearest stars and brown dwarfs
- List of potentially habitable exoplanets
- Lists of astronomical objects
- List of Solar twins
