= HD 40307 d =

Extrasolar planet in the constellation of Pictor

Discovery
- Discovered by: Mayor et al.
- Discovery site: La Silla Observatory, Chile
- Discovery date: June 16, 2008
- Detection method: radial velocity, using HARPS

Orbital characteristics
- Semi-major axis: 0.1321_{0.1255}^{0.1387} AU
- Eccentricity: 0.07_{0}^{0.18}
- Orbital period (sidereal): 20.432_{20.408}^{20.454} d
- Semi-amplitude: 2.75_{2.4}^{3.1}
- Star: HD 40307

HD 40307 d is an extrasolar planet orbiting the star HD 40307, located 42 light-years from Earth in the direction of the southern constellation Pictor. The planet was discovered by the radial velocity method, using the HARPS apparatus in June 2008. It is the most massive of the six proposed planets in the system. The planet is of interest as this star has relatively low metallicity, supporting a hypothesis that different metallicities in protostars determine what kind of planets they will form.

== Discovery ==
HD 40307 d was discovered through the Doppler spectroscopy method, which functions by measuring the variations in radial velocity in a star produced by the gravitational effect of orbiting exoplanets. The radial velocities were measured by the High Accuracy Radial Velocity Planet Searcher spectrography system (HARPS) at the La Silla Observatory in Chile's Atacama Desert. The other less massive planets orbiting HD 40307 were discovered in the same way: HD 40307 b and HD 40307 c first, and then HD 40307 e, HD 40307 f, and HD 40307 g. The discovery of HD 40307 d and the former two was announced at the astrophysics conference that took place on June 16–18, 2008 in Nantes, France.

== Orbit and mass ==
HD 40307 d has a mass of at least 9.2 times Earth's; assuming that all planets in the system have coplanar orbits, it is the most massive planet known in the system. The planet orbits approximately 0.135 astronomical units from its primary star, as compared to Earth's orbit at approximately one astronomical unit away from the Sun. As a result, one year on HD 40307 d constitutes approximately 20.45 Earth days. The eccentricity of the planet's orbit was found to not differ significantly from zero, meaning that there is insufficient data to distinguish the orbit from an entirely circular one.

The star around which HD 40307 d orbits has an unusually low metallicity compared to that of other planet-bearing stars. This supports a hypothesis concerning the possibility that the metallicity of stars during their births may determine whether a protostar's accretion disk forms gas giants or terrestrial planets.

== Characteristics ==
The planet has not been found to transit and, further, it is not likely to. It has also not been imaged. More specific physical characteristics such as radius, composition, and average surface temperature cannot be observed.

A dynamical study of planets b, c, and d showed tidal effects at least on b and c, to the extent that b had to be a sub-Neptune. All the planets from b to at least f must have migrated inward. That study implied that d was a sub-Neptune as well.

As such strong tidal forces often result in the destruction of larger natural satellites in planets orbiting close to a star, it is unlikely that HD 40307 d hosts any satellites.

== See also ==
- Mini-Neptune
