= HD 40307 c =

Extrasolar planet in the constellation Pictor

Discovery
- Discovered by: Mayor et al.
- Discovery site: La Silla Observatory, Chile
- Discovery date: June 16, 2008
- Detection method: radial velocity, using HARPS

Orbital characteristics
- Semi-major axis: 0.0799_{0.0759}^{0.0839} AU
- Eccentricity: 0.05_{0}^{0.13}
- Orbital period (sidereal): 9.6184_{9.6135}^{9.6234} d
- Semi-amplitude: 2.45_{2.17}^{2.75}
- Star: HD 40307

HD 40307 c is an extrasolar planet orbiting the star HD 40307, located 42 light-years away in the direction of the southern constellation of Pictor. The planet was discovered by the radial velocity method, using the HARPS apparatus, in June 2008. Of the six proposed planets in the HD 40307 star system, it is the third-largest, and has the second-closest orbit from the star. The planet is of interest as this star has relatively low metallicity, supporting a hypothesis that different metallicities in protostars determine what kind of planets they will form.

== Discovery ==
Like the other two exoplanets, HD 40307 b and HD 40307 d, orbiting the star HD 40307, HD 40307 c was discovered by measuring variations in the radial velocity of HD 40307 caused by the star's orbit around the center of mass of the planetary system. These measurements were made by the High Accuracy Radial Velocity Planet Searcher spectrograph apparatus (HARPS) at the La Silla Observatory in Chile's Atacama Desert. The discovery of planets in the HD 40307 system was announced in an astrophysics convention that took place in Nantes, France in mid-June 2008.

== Orbit and mass ==
HD 40307 c is the third-most massive planet in the system, with a lower mass bound 6.8 times the mass of the Earth. The planet orbits HD 40307 at about 0.08 astronomical units (AU), as compared to the Earth's distance from the Sun at 1 AU; as a result, one year on the planet constitutes approximately 9.6 Earth days. Analysis of the radial velocity data used to detect the planet does not yield a statistically significant deviation from a circular orbit.

The star around which the planet HD 40307 orbits has a low metallicity, unusual when compared to other planet-bearing stars. This supports a hypothesis concerning the possibility that the metallicity of stars during their births may determine whether a protostar's accretion disk forms gas giants or terrestrial planets.

== Characteristics ==
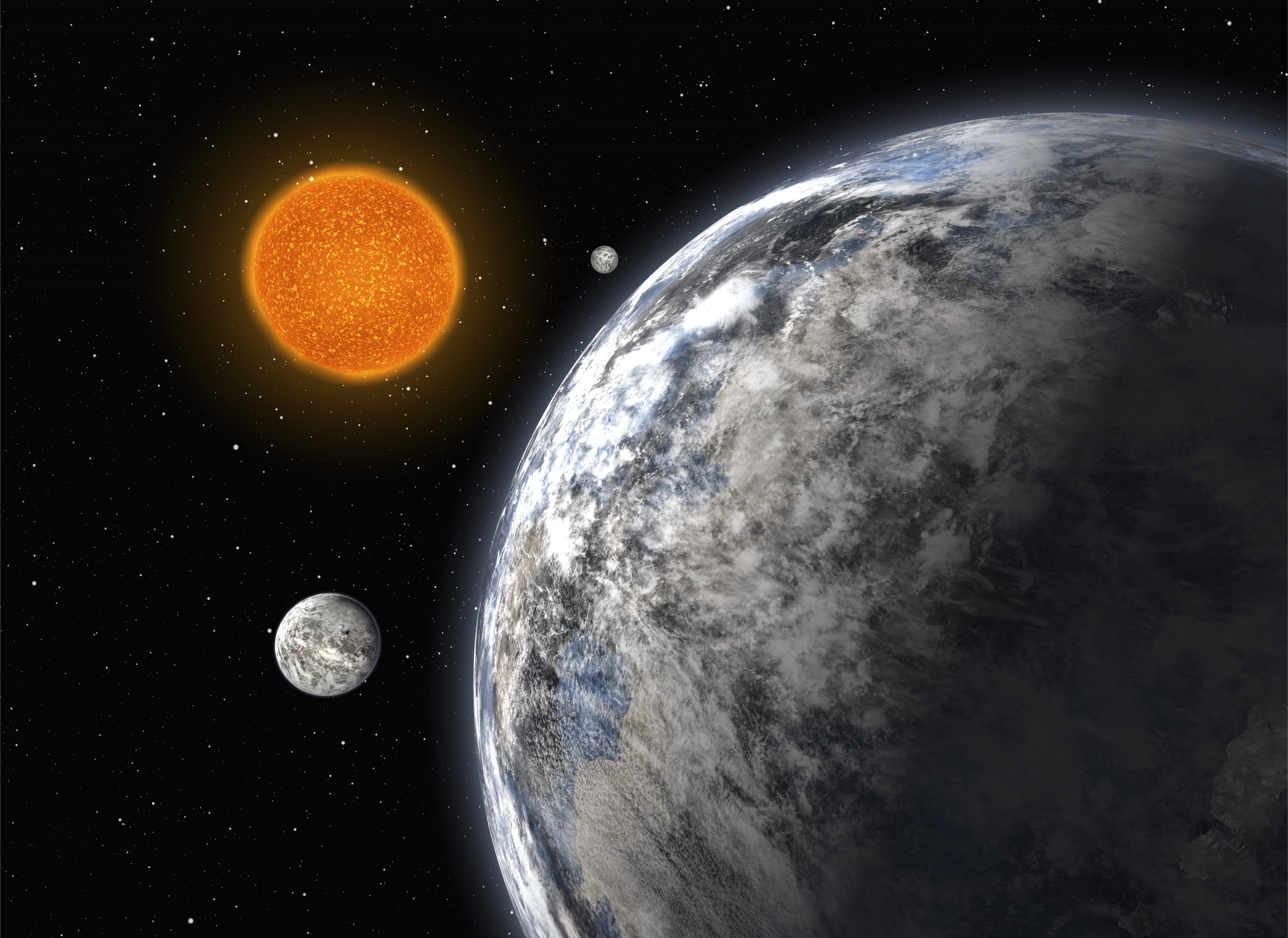
HD 40307 c. Artist impression

HD 40307 c has not been observed directly and likely does not transit. More specific characteristics (such as surface temperature, composition and radius) cannot be determined.

HD 40307 c has a small mass of at least 6.9 times Earth's, so it was first assumed terrestrial. Later in 2009 a study stated that if HD 40307 c is terrestrial, tidal heating would destabilise it, in a manner greater than this process crushes the Jovian moon Io. Such restrictions as bind terrestrial planets would not restrict ice giant planets like Neptune or Uranus. HD 40307 c might be a sub-Neptune.

Since the same tides are predicted to result in the destruction of larger natural satellites of planets located close to their parent star, it is unlikely that HD 40307 c hosts any satellites.
