= HD 40307 =

K-type star in the constellation Pictor

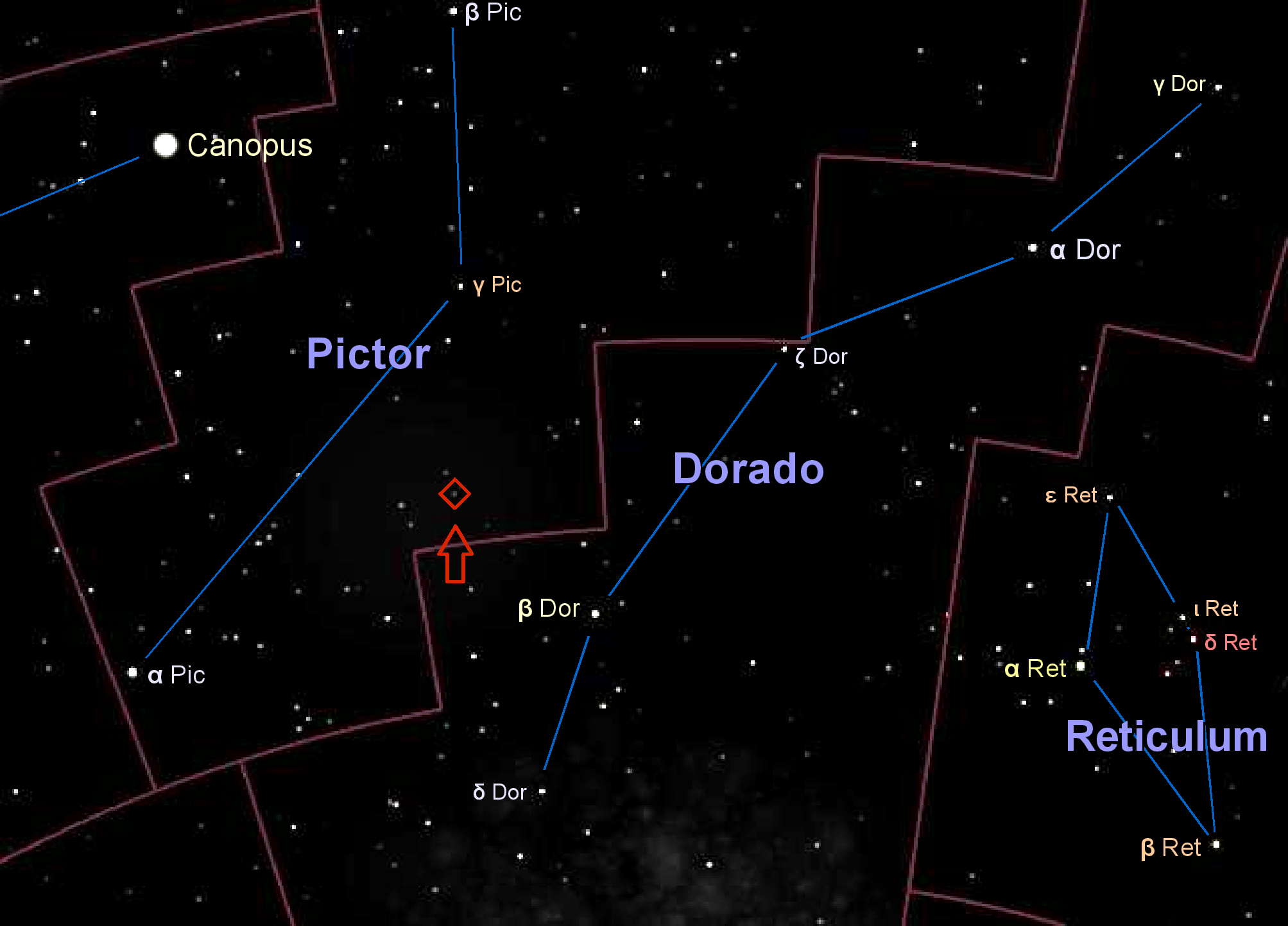
- Location of HD 40307 in the night sky. The star is marked within the red diamond below the word "Pictor".

Observation data Epoch J2000.0 Equinox ICRS
- Constellation: Pictor
- Right ascension: 05^{h} 54^{m} 04.24050^{s}
- Declination: −60° 01′ 24.4930″
- Apparent magnitude (V): 7.17

Characteristics
- Evolutionary stage: main sequence
- Spectral type: K2.5V
- B−V color index: 0.93

Astrometry
Radial velocity (R_{v})	31.08±0.12 km/s
Proper motion (μ)	RA: −52.174±0.023 mas/yr Dec.: −60.059±0.025 mas/yr
Parallax (π)	77.3261±0.0170 mas
Distance	42.179 ± 0.009 ly (12.932 ± 0.003 pc)
Absolute magnitude (M_{V})	6.57±0.01

Details
Mass	0.75^{+0.03}_{−0.04} M_{☉}
Radius	0.716±0.010 R_{☉}
Luminosity (bolometric)	0.23 L_{☉}
Luminosity (visual, L_{V})	0.20 (Note: Using the absolute visual magnitude of HD 40307 $\scriptstyle M_{V_{\ast}}=6.57$ and the absolute visual magnitude of the Sun $\scriptstyle M_{V_{\odot}}=4.83$, the visual luminosity can be calculated by $\scriptstyle \frac{L_{V_{\ast}}}{L_{V_{\odot}}}=10^{0.4\left(M_{V_{\odot}} - M_{V_{\ast}}\right)}$) L_{☉}
Surface gravity (log g)	4.47±0.16 cgs
Temperature	4,977±59 K
Metallicity [Fe/H]	−0.31±0.03 dex
Rotation	31.8±6.7 d
Rotational velocity (v sin i)	3 km/s
Age	1.2 (≥ 0.2) Gyr

Other designations
- CD−60 1303, CPD−60 508, GC 7474, GJ 2046, HIP 27887, PPM 355061, SAO 249388, 2MASS J05540421-6001245.

Database references
SIMBAD	data
Exoplanet Archive	data
ARICNS	data

HD 40307 is an orange (K-type) main-sequence star located approximately 42 light-years away in the constellation of Pictor (the Easel), taking its primary name from its Henry Draper Catalogue designation. It is calculated to be slightly less massive than the Sun. The star has six known planets, three discovered in 2008 and three more in 2012. One of them, HD 40307 g, is a potential super-Earth in the habitable zone, with an orbital period of about 200 days. This object might be capable of supporting liquid water on its surface, although much more information must be acquired before its habitability can be assessed.

No stellar companions to HD 40307 were detected as of 2018.

== History and nomenclature ==
HD 40307 was observed during or before 1900 as part of the Cape Photographic Durchmusterung. The designation HD 40307 is from the Henry Draper Catalogue, which is based on spectral classifications made between 1911 and 1915 by Annie Jump Cannon and her co-workers, and was published between 1918 and 1924.

== Characteristics ==
As a K-type star, HD 40307 emits orange-tinted light. It has only about three-quarters of the Sun's radius and mass. Its temperature is measured at slightly under 5,000 K.

The astronomers who discovered the planets orbiting HD 40307 suggested that the metallicities of stars determine whether or not the planetary bodies that orbit them will be terrestrial, like Earth, or gaseous, like Jupiter and Saturn.

=== Distance and visibility ===
Despite its relative proximity to the Sun at 42 light-years, HD 40307 is not visible to the naked eye, given its apparent magnitude of 7.17. It came within 6.4 light-years of the Sun about 413,000 years ago.

== Planetary system ==
A planetary system around HD 40307 contains four confirmed planets and two other possible planets, all within 0.6 AU of the star.

The HD 40307 planetary system
Companion (in order from star)	Mass	Semimajor axis (AU)	Orbital period (days)	Eccentricity	Inclination (°)	Radius
b	≥ 4.0^{+0.8}_{−0.7} M_{🜨}	0.0468^{+0.0023}_{−0.0024}	4.3123^{+0.0011}_{−0.0012}	0.20^{+0.16}_{−0.14}	>0.2022	—
c	≥ 6.6^{+1.1}_{−1.0} M_{🜨}	0.0799±0.0040	9.6184^{+0.0050}_{−0.0049}	0.06^{+0.06}_{−0.11}	>0.2109	—
d	≥ 9.5^{+1.7}_{−1.5} M_{🜨}	0.1321^{+0.0066}_{−0.0064}	20.432^{+0.022}_{−0.024}	0.07^{+0.11}_{−0.07}	>0.2855	—
e (disputed)	≥ 3.5±1.4 M_{🜨}	0.1886^{+0.083}_{−0.0104}	34.62^{+0.21}_{−0.20}	0.15^{+0.13}_{−0.15}	—	—
f	≥ 5.2^{+1.5}_{−1.6} M_{🜨}	0.247^{+0.011}_{−0.014}	51.76^{+0.50}_{−0.46}	0.02^{+0.20}_{−0.02}	—	—
g (disputed)	≥ 7.1±2.6 M_{🜨}	0.600^{+0.034}_{−0.033}	197.8^{+9.0}_{−5.7}	0.29^{+0.31}_{−0.29}	—	—

The orbits of the inner three planets of HD 40307.

After spending five years observing the star, the European Organisation for Astronomical Research in the Southern Hemisphere (ESO) announced that they had discovered three super-Earths in orbit around HD 40307 in June 2008. All three planets were detected by the radial velocity method, using the HARPS spectrograph system.

In 2012, an independent analysis carried out by a team of astronomers led by Mikko Tuomi of the University of Hertfordshire confirmed the existence of these planets and found an additional three planets in the systems. The planet HD 40307 f on 51.6-day orbit was confirmed in 2015, with inconclusive evidence for the planets HD 40307 e and HD 40307 g.

Five of the planets orbit very close to the star, with the farthest of them located twice as close to HD 40307 than is the planet Mercury is to the Sun. (Note: Mercury orbits at approx. 0.39 AU) The outermost planet orbits at a distance similar to the distance of Venus to the Sun and is situated well in the system's liquid water habitable zone.

The minimum masses of the planets in the system ranges from three to ten times the mass of the Earth, placing them somewhere between Earth and gas giants like Uranus and Neptune. Dynamical analysis of the innermost planets suggests that planet b is unstable at its age unless it is an ice giant, having migrated from further away. That implies similar for the other planets, even further out. The most recent discovery also indicates via dynamical analysis that the true planetary masses can not be much higher than their minimum masses.

== See also ==
- List of multiplanetary systems
- List of extrasolar planets
- Other stars with planets discovered in June 2008:
  - HD 181433
  - HD 47186
  - MOA-2007-BLG-192L
