= 41 G. Arae =

Multiple star in the constellation Ara

- Location of 41 G. Arae (circled in red)

Observation data Epoch J2000 Equinox ICRS
- Constellation: Ara
- 41 G. Ara A
- Right ascension: 17^{h} 19^{m} 03.83755^{s}
- Declination: −46° 38′ 10.4404″
- Apparent magnitude (V): 5.61
- 41 G. Ara B
- Right ascension: 17^{h} 19^{m} 02.96880^{s}
- Declination: −46° 38′ 13.1081″
- Apparent magnitude (V): 8.88

Characteristics
- Spectral type: G8V + M0V
- U−B color index: +0.38
- B−V color index: +0.80
- R−I color index: +0.41

Astrometry

41 G. Ara A
Radial velocity (R_{v})	25.96±0.14 km/s
Proper motion (μ)	RA: 1,029.610 mas/yr Dec.: 106.935 mas/yr
Parallax (π)	113.7513±0.0725 mas
Distance	28.67 ± 0.02 ly (8.791 ± 0.006 pc)
Absolute magnitude (M_{V})	5.74

41 G. Ara B
Radial velocity (R_{v})	26.02±1.17 km/s
Proper motion (μ)	RA: 952.035 mas/yr Dec.: 138.380 mas/yr
Parallax (π)	113.86±0.03 mas
Distance	28.645 ± 0.008 ly (8.783 ± 0.002 pc)

Orbit
Primary	41 G. Ara A
Name	41 G. Ara B
Period (P)	954±69 yr
Semi-major axis (a)	12.752″±0.548″ (112 AU) (Note: Calculated using the parallax of 0.11375 arcseconds and the separation of 12.752 arcseconds. 12.752" / 0.11375" = 112 AU.)
Eccentricity (e)	0.816±0.007
Inclination (i)	35.2±0.8°
Longitude of the node (Ω)	150.3±1.3°
Periastron epoch (T)	1908.2±0.28
Argument of periastron (ω) (secondary)	320.2±2.5°
Semi-amplitude (K_{1}) (primary)	1.956±0.068 km/s

Orbit
Primary	41 G. Ara Ba
Name	41 G. Ara Bb
Period (P)	0.24069 yr
Semi-major axis (a)	0.0410″±0.0024″ (0.36 AU) (Note: Calculated using the parallax of 0.11386 arcseconds and the separation of 0.0410 arcseconds. 0.0410" / 0.11386" = 0.36 AU.)
Eccentricity (e)	0.773
Inclination (i)	57.9±4.9°
Longitude of the node (Ω)	170.6±3.1°
Periastron epoch (T)	2015.903±0.012
Argument of periastron (ω) (secondary)	242.2±14.8°

Details

41 G. Ara A
Mass	0.87 M_{☉}
Radius	0.82±0.02 R_{☉}
Luminosity	0.46±0.02 L_{☉}
Surface gravity (log g)	4.434±0.048 cgs
Temperature	5,232+38 −45 K
Metallicity [Fe/H]	−0.39±0.05 dex
Rotational velocity (v sin i)	1.97±0.19 km/s
Age	5.5–6.3 Gyr

41 G. Ara Ba
Mass	0.60 M_{☉}
Radius	0.650 R_{☉}

41 G. Ara Bb
Mass	0.42 M_{☉}

Other designations
- CD−46°11370, GJ 666, CCDM J17191-4638, WDS J17191-4638
- 41 G. Ara A: HD 156274, HIP 84720, HR 6416, SAO 227816, LTT 6886, TIC 217157387, TYC 8341-4366-1
- 41 G. Ara B: LHS 445, LTT 6887, NLTT 44525, TIC 217157392, TYC 8341-4365-1

Database references
SIMBAD	41 G. Ara
- 41 G. Ara A
- 41 G. Ara B
ARICNS	41 G. Ara A
- 41 G. Ara B

41 G. Arae (abbreviated to 41 G. Ara), also known as Gliese 666, is a trinary star system in the constellation Ara. Although often called just 41 Arae, it is more accurate to call it 41 G. Arae, as the number 41 is the Gould designation and not the Flamsteed designation. The combined apparent magnitude is +5.48, making it faintly visible to the naked eye in locations far from light pollution. This system lies at a distance of 28.7 light-years (8.8 parsecs) and thus is relatively nearby.

== Characteristics ==
41 G. Arae is a hierarchical triple star system, made up of an outer pair, 41 G. Arae A and B, and an inner pair, 41 G. Arae Ba and Bb. Two other visual companions were proposed, but neither share the system's motion. 41 G. Arae A and B share a highly eccentric orbit that takes around a millennium to complete. Their semi-major axis is of 112 astronomical units. As of 2025, the last periastron was in 1908.

The primary star in this system is a G-type main sequence star with a stellar classification of G8V. It has about 87% of the mass of the Sun, and 82% of the Sun's radius.

The secondary component of the outer binary, 41 G. Arae B, is itself a pair of red dwarfs that complete an orbit around each other every 88 days, and are also in an eccentric orbit. Their semi-major axis is of 0.36 astronomical units. 41 G. Arae Ba and Bb have masses of 0.60 and 0.41 solar masses, respectively. It has a peculiar spectrum that shows a deficiency in elements with a higher atomic number than helium.

== Motion ==
This system has a relatively high proper motion, moving over a second of arc across the sky each year. The space velocity components of this system are [U, V, W] = [+38, +30, −19] km/s. The stars in this system show low chromospheric activity, and have a net space velocity of 52 km/s relative to the Sun. This, in combination with their low metallicity, shows that the pair belongs to the old disk population.

== See also ==
- List of star systems within 25–30 light-years
- Gliese 667
- List of nearest G-type stars
