= HD 40307 f =

Exoplanet orbiting the star HD 40307 in the constellation of Pictor

Discovery
- Discovered by: Mikko Tuomi et al.
- Discovery site: La Silla Observatory, Chile
- Discovery date: October 28, 2012
- Detection method: radial velocity, using HARPS

Orbital characteristics
- Semi-major axis: 0.247 [0.233, 0.258] AU
- Eccentricity: 0.03 [0, 0.13]
- Orbital period (sidereal): 51.76 [51.30, 52.26] d
- Semi-amplitude: 1.09 [0.77, 1.37]
- Star: HD 40307

HD 40307 f is an extrasolar planet orbiting the star HD 40307. It is located 42 light-years away in the direction of the southern constellation Pictor. The planet was discovered by the radial velocity method, using the European Southern Observatory's HARPS apparatus by a team of astronomers led by Mikko Tuomi at the University of Hertfordshire and Guillem Anglada-Escude of the University of Göttingen, Germany. The existence of planet was confirmed in 2015.

== Planetary characteristics ==
This planet is the fifth planet from the star, at a distance of about 0.25 AU (compared to 0.39 AU for Mercury) with negligible eccentricity.

HD 40307 f's minimum mass is 5.2 that of Earth, and dynamical models suggest it cannot be much more (and so is measured close to edge-on). Planets like this in that system have been presumed "super-Earth".

Even though HD 40307 f is closer to the star than Mercury is to the Sun, it gets (slightly) less insolation than Mercury gets because the parent star is dimmer than our home star. It still gets more heat than Venus gets (like Gliese 581 c), and it has more gravitational potential than Venus has. HD 40307 f is more likely a super-Venus than a "super-Earth".

Moreover, planets b, c, and d are presumed to have migrated in from outer orbits; and planet b is predicted a sub-Neptune.
