= Gliese 667 Cb =

Super-Earth orbiting Gliese 667

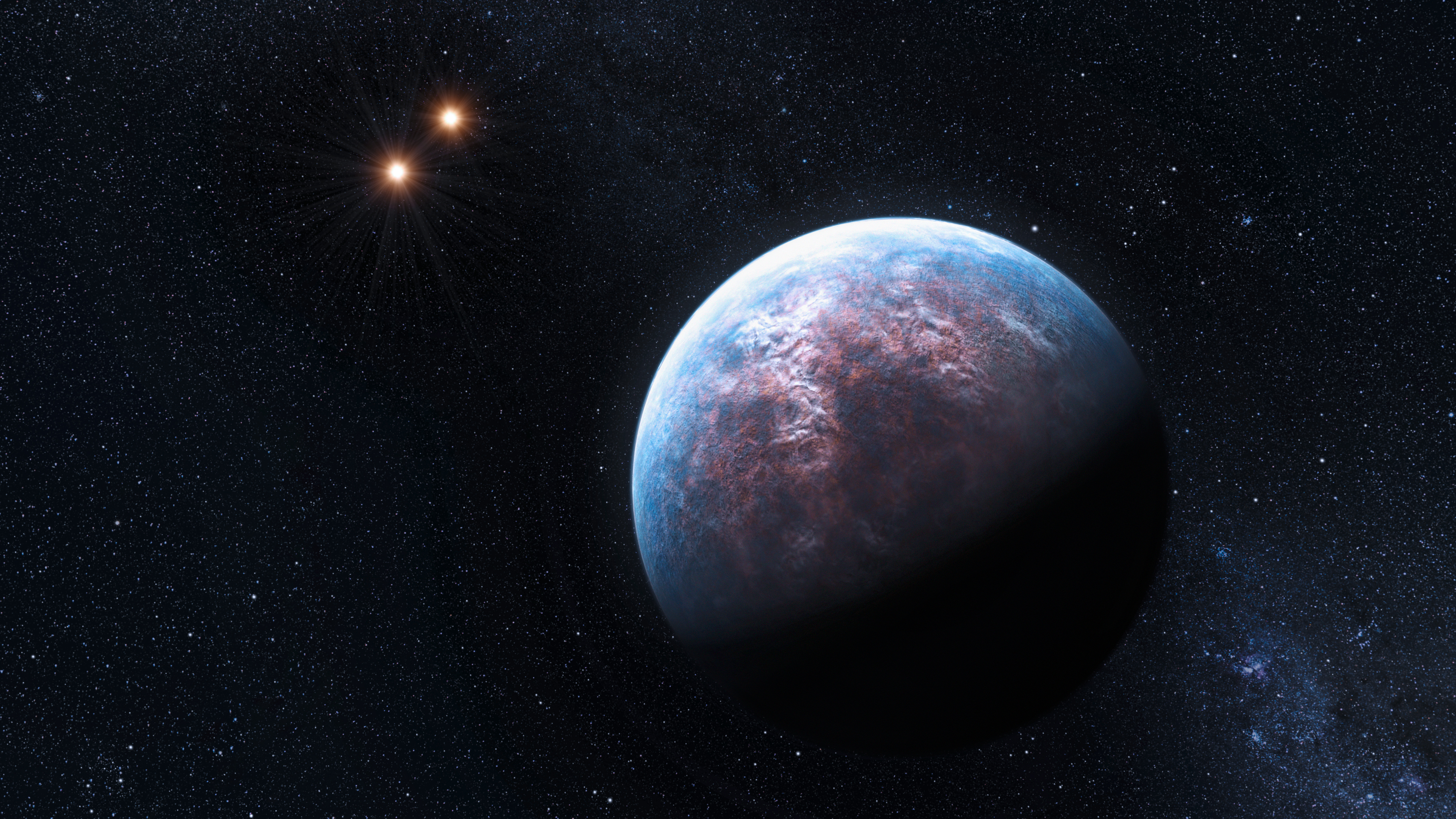
- Artist's impression of Gliese 667 Cb if rocky with the Gliese 667 AB binary in the background

Discovery
- Discovery date: 2009
- Detection method: Radial velocity (European Southern Observatory)

Orbital characteristics
- Semi-major axis: 0.050432±0.000001 AU
- Eccentricity: 0.112
- Orbital period (sidereal): 7.2006 d
- Inclination: >30
- Semi-amplitude: 3.8
- Star: Gliese 667C

Physical characteristics
- Mass: 5.94–~12 M_{🜨}
- Temperature: 473 K (200 °C; 392 °F)

Gliese 667 Cb is an exoplanet orbiting the star Gliese 667 C, a member of the Gliese 667 triple-star system. It is the most massive planet discovered in the system and is likely a super-Earth or a mini-Neptune. Orbital-stability analysis indicates that it cannot be more than twice its minimum mass. It orbits too close to the star to be in the habitable zone and thus not suitable for life as we know it. Eccentricity analysis indicates that Gliese 667 Cb is not a rocky planet.

The planet is likely to be tidally locked. Thus, one side of the planet is in permanent daylight and the other side in permanent darkness.
