= Wolf 1069 =

Red dwarf star in the constellation Cygnus

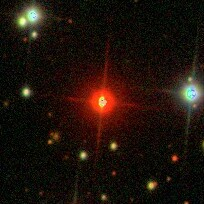
- SDSS image of Wolf 1069

Observation data Epoch J2000 Equinox ICRS
- Constellation: Cygnus
- Right ascension: 20^{h} 26^{m} 05.30213^{s}
- Declination: +58° 34′ 22.6804″
- Apparent magnitude (V): 14.2

Characteristics
- Evolutionary stage: Main sequence
- Spectral type: M5.0V
- Apparent magnitude (G): 12.352±0.003
- Apparent magnitude (J): 9.029±0.039
- Apparent magnitude (H): 8.483±0.073
- Apparent magnitude (K): 8.095±0.021

Astrometry
Radial velocity (R_{v})	−60.26±0.54 km/s
Proper motion (μ)	RA: 261.038 mas/yr Dec.: 542.906 mas/yr
Parallax (π)	104.4415±0.0261 mas
Distance	31.229 ± 0.008 ly (9.575 ± 0.002 pc)
Absolute magnitude (M_{V})	14.3

Details
Mass	0.167±0.011 M_{☉}
Radius	0.1813±0.0063 R_{☉}
Luminosity (bolometric)	0.002944±0.000028 L_{☉}
Habitable zone inner limit	0.056 AU
Habitable zone outer limit	0.111 AU
Surface gravity (log g)	4.93±0.06 cgs
Temperature	3158±54 K
Metallicity [Fe/H]	0.07±0.19 dex
Rotation	156.30±8.69 days
Rotational velocity (v sin i)	<2 km/s

Other designations
- GJ 1253, Ci 20 1209, G 230-40, LFT 1550, LHS 3549, LSPM J2026+5834, LTT 15977, NLTT 49289, PLX 4870.01, PM J20260+5834, Wolf 1069, TIC 352617553, 2MASS J20260528+5834224

Database references
SIMBAD	data
Exoplanet Archive	data
ARICNS	data

Wolf 1069 is a red dwarf star located 31.2 light-years (9.6 parsecs) away from the Solar System in the constellation of Cygnus. The star has 17% the mass and 18% the radius of the Sun, a temperature of 3,158 K (2,885 °C; 5,225 °F), and a slow rotation period of 150–170 days. It hosts one known exoplanet called Wolf 1069 b which could possibly sustain life.

== Planetary system ==
A planetary companion to Wolf 1069 was discovered in 2023 via radial velocity. It has a minimum mass close to that of Earth and orbits within the habitable zone of its star, with an orbital period of 15 days. This planet does not transit its host star. Observations have ruled out any additional planets greater than one Earth mass with orbital periods of less than 10 days.

As of its discovery, Wolf 1069 b is the sixth-closest known Earth-mass planet within the conservatively defined habitable zone, after Proxima Centauri b, GJ 1061 d, Teegarden's Star c, and GJ 1002 b & c.

The Wolf 1069 planetary system
Companion (in order from star)	Mass	Semimajor axis (AU)	Orbital period (days)	Eccentricity	Inclination (°)	Radius
b	≥1.26±0.21 M_{🜨}	0.0672±0.0014	15.564±0.015	—	—	~1.08 (Note: The radius of this planet has not been measured; this value is an estimate.) R_{🜨}
