= Mikko Tuomi =

Finnish astronomer

- Born: 17 June 1979 (age 47); Espoo, Finland
- Citizenship: Finland
- Education: University of Turku (Ph.D.)
- Political party: Left Alliance
- Scientific career
- Fields: Astronomy
- Workplaces: University of Turku; University of Hertfordshire
- Thesis: Multidata inverse problems and Bayesian solution methods in astronomy (2013)
- Doctoral advisor: Harry Lehto; Esko Valtaoja

Mikko Tuomi (born 17 June 1979) is a Finnish astronomer most known for his contributions to the discovery of the exoplanet Proxima Centauri b together with other scientists at the University of Hertfordshire. Other exoplanets to whose discovery or study Tuomi has contributed include HD 40307, HD 154857 c, Kapteyn c, Gliese 682 c, HD 154857, Gliese 221, Gliese 581 g and the planetary system orbiting Tau Ceti.

== Publications ==
Mikko Tuomi has contributed to many cosmologist research articles including:

- "A Super-Earth in the Habitable Zone"
- "Two planets around Kapteyn's star: A cold and a temperate super-Earth orbiting the nearest halo red dwarf"
- "Bayesian search for low-mass planets around nearby M. draws. Estimates for occurrence rate based on global detestability statistics"
- "A dynamically-packed planetary system around GJ667C with three super-Earths in its habitable zone"

== Discoveries ==
Mikko Tuomi helped discover the Proxima Centauri b planet by observing the gravitational tug of Proxima Centauri's star, Proxima Centauri.

== Political career ==
Tuomi participated in the concurrent 2025 Finnish municipal elections and 2025 Finnish county elections in the Turku constituency as a member of the Left Alliance. He received 132 and 113 votes respectively.

== See also ==
- Exoplanetology
- List of potentially habitable exoplanets
- Proxima Centauri
