= HD 40307 g =

Exoplanet candidate in the constellation of Pictor

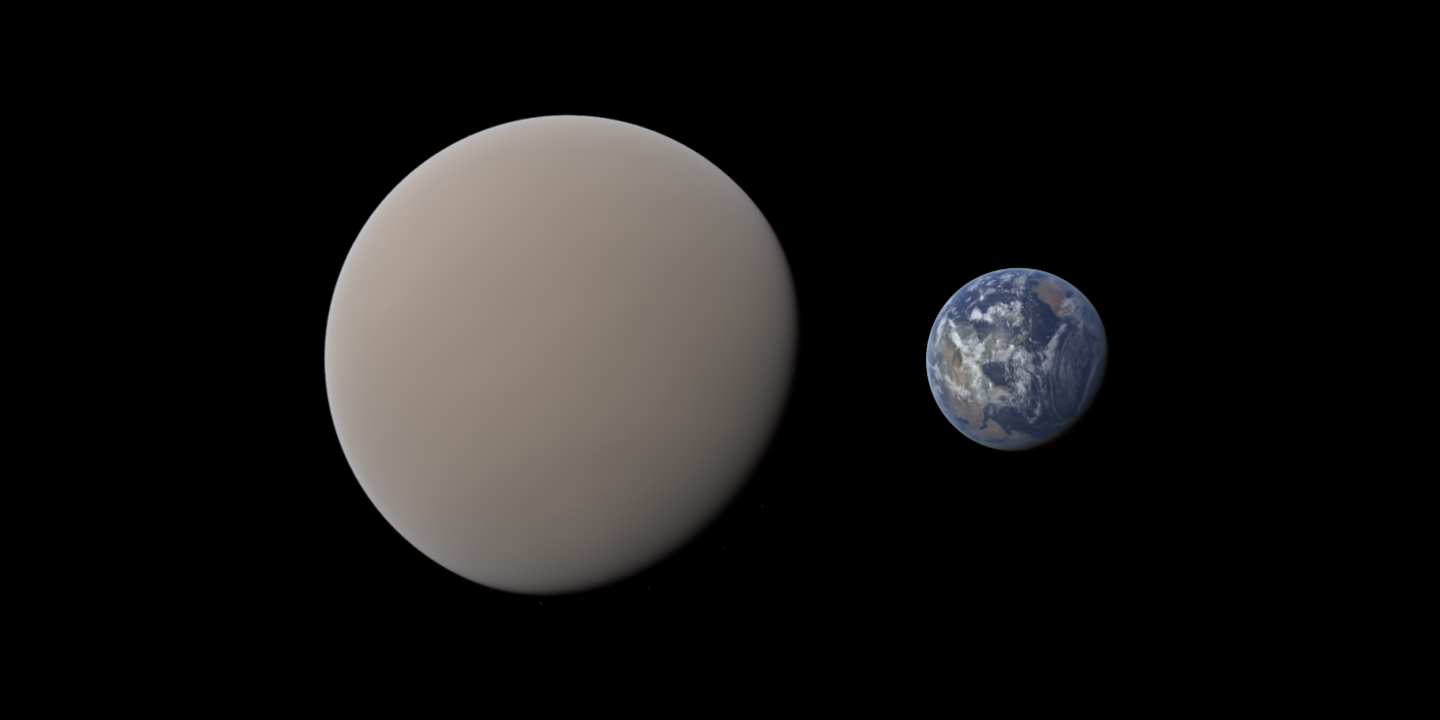
- Approximate size comparison of HD 40307 g with Earth.

Discovery
- Discovered by: Mikko Tuomi et al.
- Discovery site: La Silla Observatory, Chile
- Discovery date: October 28, 2012
- Detection method: radial velocity, using HARPS

Orbital characteristics
- Semi-major axis: 0.600 AU (89,800,000 km)
- Eccentricity: 0.22
- Orbital period (sidereal): 197.8 ± 9.0 d
- Semi-amplitude: 0.95 ± 0.3
- Star: HD 40307

Physical characteristics
- Mean radius: 2.39 R_{🜨}
- Mass: 7.09 M_{🜨}
- Temperature: 277.6

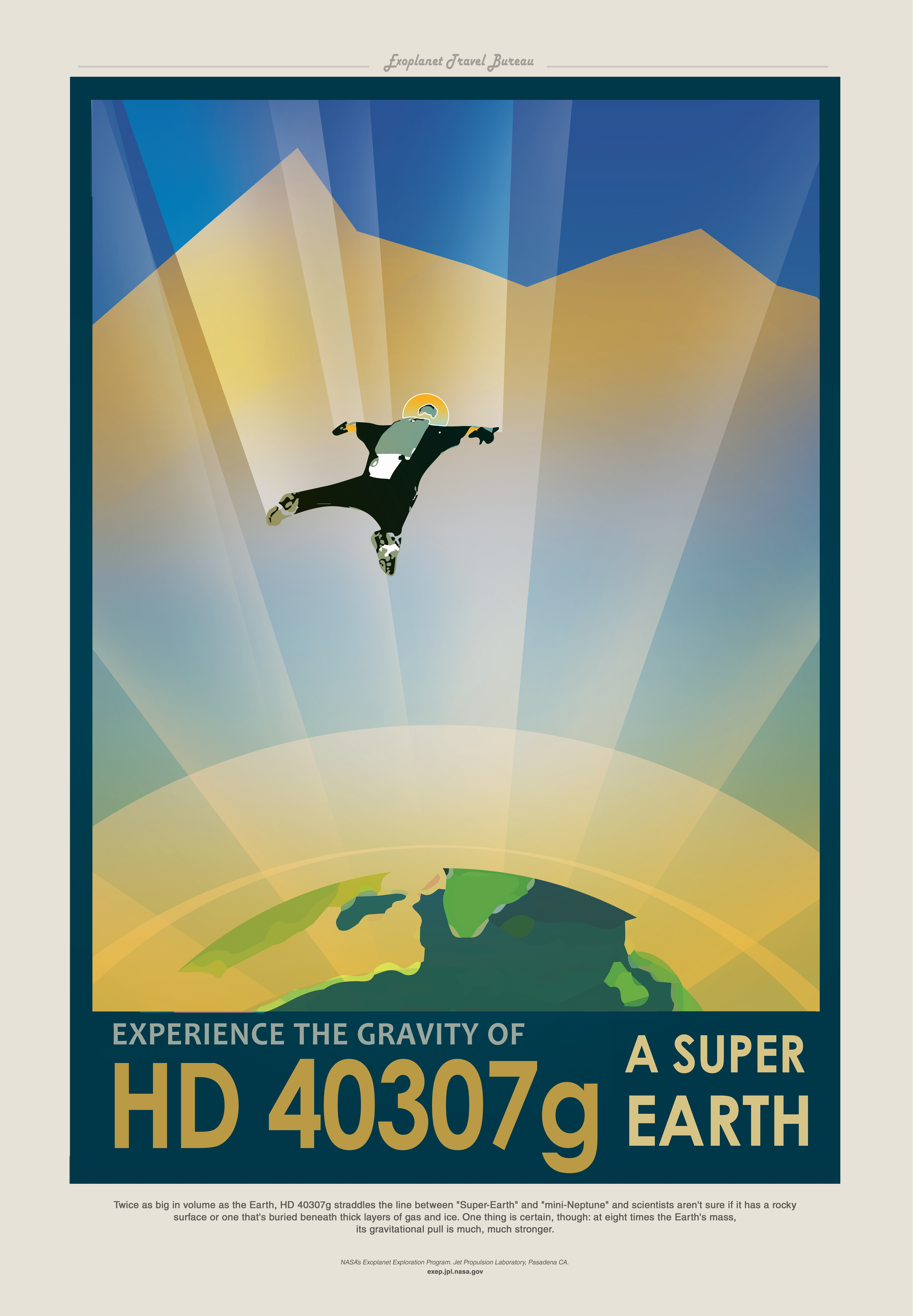
NASA Exoplanet Exploration Program "travel poster" for HD 40307 g

HD 40307 g is an exoplanet candidate suspected to be orbiting in the habitable zone of HD 40307. It is located 42 light-years away in the direction of the southern constellation Pictor. The planet was discovered by the radial velocity method, using the European Southern Observatory's HARPS apparatus by a team of astronomers led by Mikko Tuomi at the University of Hertfordshire and Guillem Anglada-Escude of the University of Göttingen, Germany.

The existence of the planet was disputed in 2015, as more Doppler spectroscopy data has become available.

== Planetary characteristics ==
The codiscoverer Hugh Jones, of the University of Hertfordshire in England, surmised: "The longer orbit of the new planet means that its climate and atmosphere may be just right to support life."

However, another astronomer, Rory Barnes of the University of Washington, had already studied the orbits of the planets b, c, and d. First, Barnes had presumed b to take on too much tidal heating for it to be terrestrial, instead predicting a "mini-Neptune". He thought that b, c, and d had all migrated inward, which extrapolates to e and f as well, which are further out, but not by much. It is possible that HD 40307 g has also migrated into where it is now. The discoverers of HD 40307 g did not try to refute Barnes, on the nature of b and its extrapolation to the other planets. The composition of g is unsettled. Lead author Mikko Tuomi, also of the University of Hertfordshire, stated "If I had to guess, I would say 50-50 ... But the truth at the moment is that we simply do not know whether the planet is a large Earth or a small, warm Neptune without a solid surface."

== See also ==
- Circumstellar habitable zone
- Extrasolar planet
- List of potentially habitable exoplanets
- Planetary habitability
