= Gliese 667 =

Triple-star system in the constellation Scorpius

Gliese 667 A/B/C
- Location of Gliese 667 (circled in red)

Observation data Epoch J2000 Equinox ICRS
- Constellation: Scorpius
- AB
- Right ascension: 17^{h} 18^{m} 57.16483^{s}
- Declination: −34° 59′ 23.1416″
- Apparent magnitude (V): 5.91/7.20
- C
- Right ascension: 17^{h} 18^{m} 58.82730^{s}
- Declination: −34° 59′ 48.6127″
- Apparent magnitude (V): 10.20

Characteristics

AB
- Spectral type: K3V + K5V

C
- Evolutionary stage: main sequence
- Spectral type: M1.5V

Astrometry

GJ 667 AB
Parallax (π)	138.2±0.7 mas
Distance	23.6 ± 0.1 ly (7.24 ± 0.04 pc)
Absolute magnitude (M_{V})	6.75

GJ 667 C
Radial velocity (R_{v})	+6.4 km/s
Proper motion (μ)	RA: 1131.517 mas/yr Dec.: −215.569 mas/yr
Parallax (π)	138.0663±0.0283 mas
Distance	23.623 ± 0.005 ly (7.243 ± 0.001 pc)

Orbit
Primary	Gliese 667 A
Name	Gliese 667 B
Period (P)	42.152±0.039 yr
Semi-major axis (a)	1.8260±0.0017" (13.21 AU (Note: Semi-major axis in AU = (semimajor axis in seconds)/ parallax = 1.8260″/0.1382 = 13.21 AU; as the eccentricity is 0.57, the distance fluctuates between 43% and 157% of that, roughly from 5.6 AU to 20.8 AU.))
Eccentricity (e)	0.57374±0.00029
Inclination (i)	127.662±0.034°
Longitude of the node (Ω)	133.574±0.063°
Periastron epoch (T)	1,933.752±0.079
Argument of periastron (ω) (secondary)	68.451±0.056°

Details

Gliese 667 A
Mass	0.65±0.12 M_{☉}
Radius	0.76 R_{☉}
Temperature	4,270 K
Metallicity [Fe/H]	–0.59 dex

Gliese 667 B
Mass	0.448±0.085 M_{☉}
Radius	0.70 R_{☉}
Temperature	3,998 K
Metallicity [Fe/H]	–0.59 dex

Gliese 667 C
Mass	0.327±0.008 M_{☉}
Radius	0.337±0.014 R_{☉}
Luminosity	0.01439±0.00035 L_{☉}
Temperature	3,443+75 −71 K
Metallicity [Fe/H]	–0.59 ± 0.10 dex
Rotation	103.9±0.7 days
Age	6.10±2.2 Gyr

Other designations
- CD−34°11626, GJ 667, HD 156384, HR 6426, WDS J17190-3459, G 142 G. Scorpii
- AB: HIP 84709, SAO 208670, LHS 442, 2MASS J17185698-3459236
- C: LHS 443, 2MASS J17185868-3459483

Database references
SIMBAD	AB
- A
- B
- C
- Cb
- Cc
- Ce
- Cf
- Cg
Exoplanet Archive	data
ARICNS	A
- B
- C

Gliese 667 (142 G. Scorpii) is a triple-star system in the constellation Scorpius lying at a distance of about 7.2 parsecs (23 light-years) from Earth. All three of the stars have masses smaller than the Sun. To the naked eye, the system appears to be a single faint star of magnitude 5.89. The system has a relatively high proper motion, exceeding 1 second of arc per year.

There is a 12th-magnitude star visually close to the other three, but it is a distant background star not gravitationally bound to the system.

The two brightest stars in this system, GJ 667 A and GJ 667 B, are orbiting each other at an average angular separation of 1.81 arcseconds with a high eccentricity of 0.58. At the estimated distance of this system, this is equivalent to a physical separation of about 12.6 AU, or nearly 13 times the separation of the Earth from the Sun. Their eccentric orbit brings the pair as close as about 5 AU to each other, or as distant as 20 AU, corresponding to an eccentricity of 0.6. (Note: Based on a calculated eccentricity value of $e={{r_a-r_p}\over{r_a+r_p}}$.) This orbit takes approximately 42.15 years to complete and the orbital plane is inclined at an angle of 128° to the line of sight from the Earth. The third star, GJ 667 C, orbits the GJ 667 AB pair at an angular separation of about 30", which equates to a minimum separation of 230 AU. GJ 667 C also has a system of two confirmed super-Earths and a number of additional doubtful candidates, though the innermost, GJ 667 Cb, may be a gas dwarf; GJ 667 Cc, and the controversial Cf and Ce, are in the circumstellar habitable zone.

== Gliese 667 A ==
The largest star in the system, Gliese 667 A (GJ 667 A), is a K-type main-sequence star of stellar classification K3V. It has about 65% of the mass of the Sun and 76% of the Sun's radius, but is radiating only around 12-13% of the luminosity of the Sun. The concentration of elements other than hydrogen and helium, what astronomers term the star's metallicity, is much lower than in the Sun with a relative abundance of around 26% solar. The apparent visual magnitude of this star is 6.29, which, at the star's estimated distance, gives an absolute magnitude of around 7.07 (assuming negligible extinction from interstellar matter).

== Gliese 667 B ==
Like the primary, the secondary star Gliese 667 B (GJ 667 B) is a K-type main-sequence star, although it has a slightly later stellar classification of K5V. This star has a mass of about 45% of the Sun, or 69% of the primary's mass, and it is radiating about 5% of the Sun's visual luminosity. The secondary's apparent magnitude is 7.24, giving it an absolute magnitude of around 8.02.

== Gliese 667 C ==
Gliese 667 C is the smallest star in the system, with only around 33% of the mass of the Sun and 34% of the Sun's radius, orbiting approximately 230 AU from the Gliese 667 AB pair. It is a red dwarf with a stellar classification of M1.5. This star is radiating only 1.4% of the Sun's luminosity from its outer atmosphere at a relatively cool effective temperature of 3,440 K. This temperature is what gives it the red-hued glow that is a characteristic of M-type stars. The apparent magnitude of the star is 10.25, giving it an absolute magnitude of about 11.03. It is known to have a system of two planets; claims have been made for up to five additional planets but this is likely to be in error due to failure to account for correlated noise in the radial velocity data. The red dwarf status of the star would allow planet Cc, which is in the habitable zone, to receive minimal amounts of ultraviolet radiation.

=== Planetary system ===
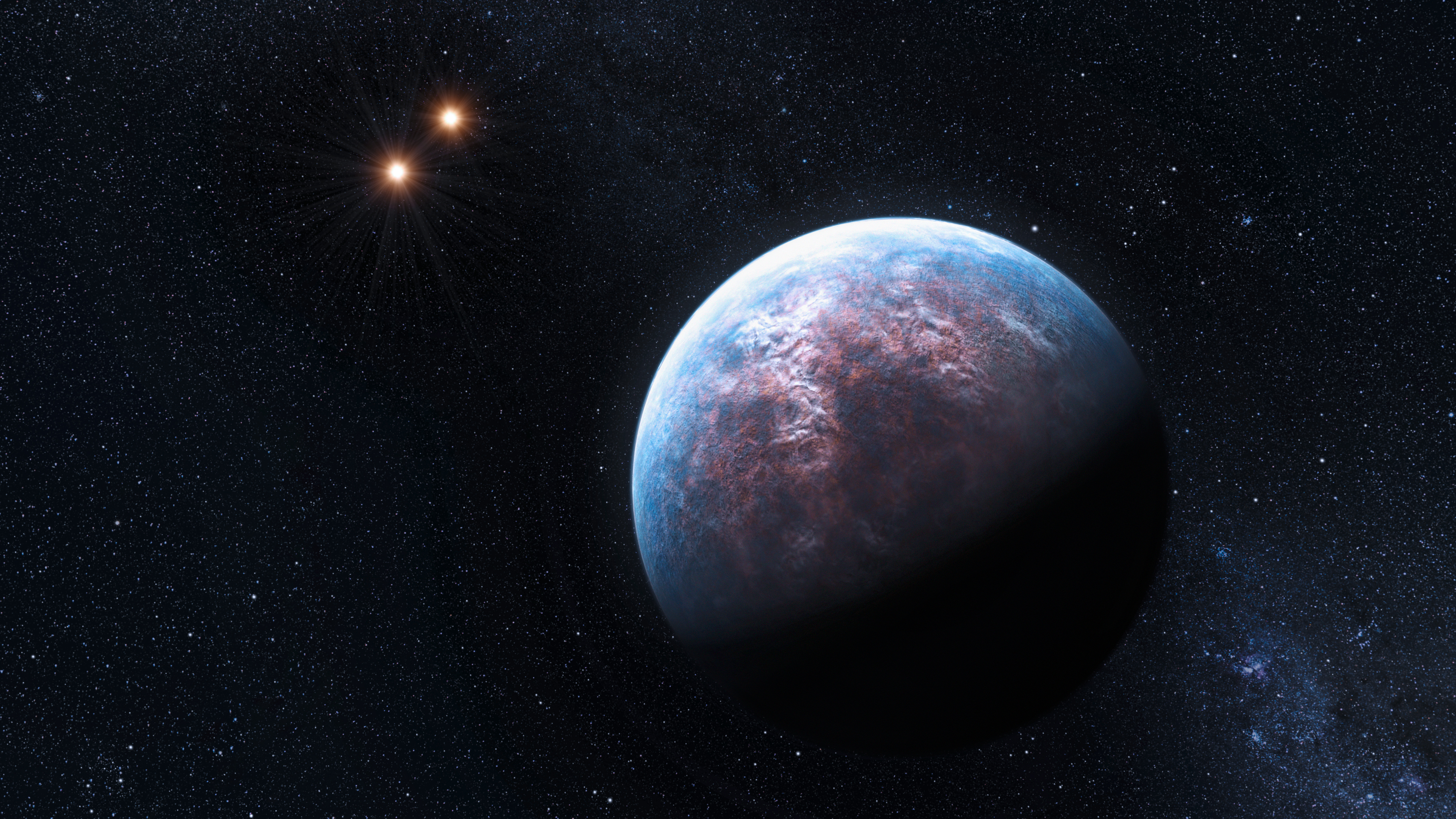
Artist's impression of Gliese 667 Cb with the Gliese 667 A/B binary in the background

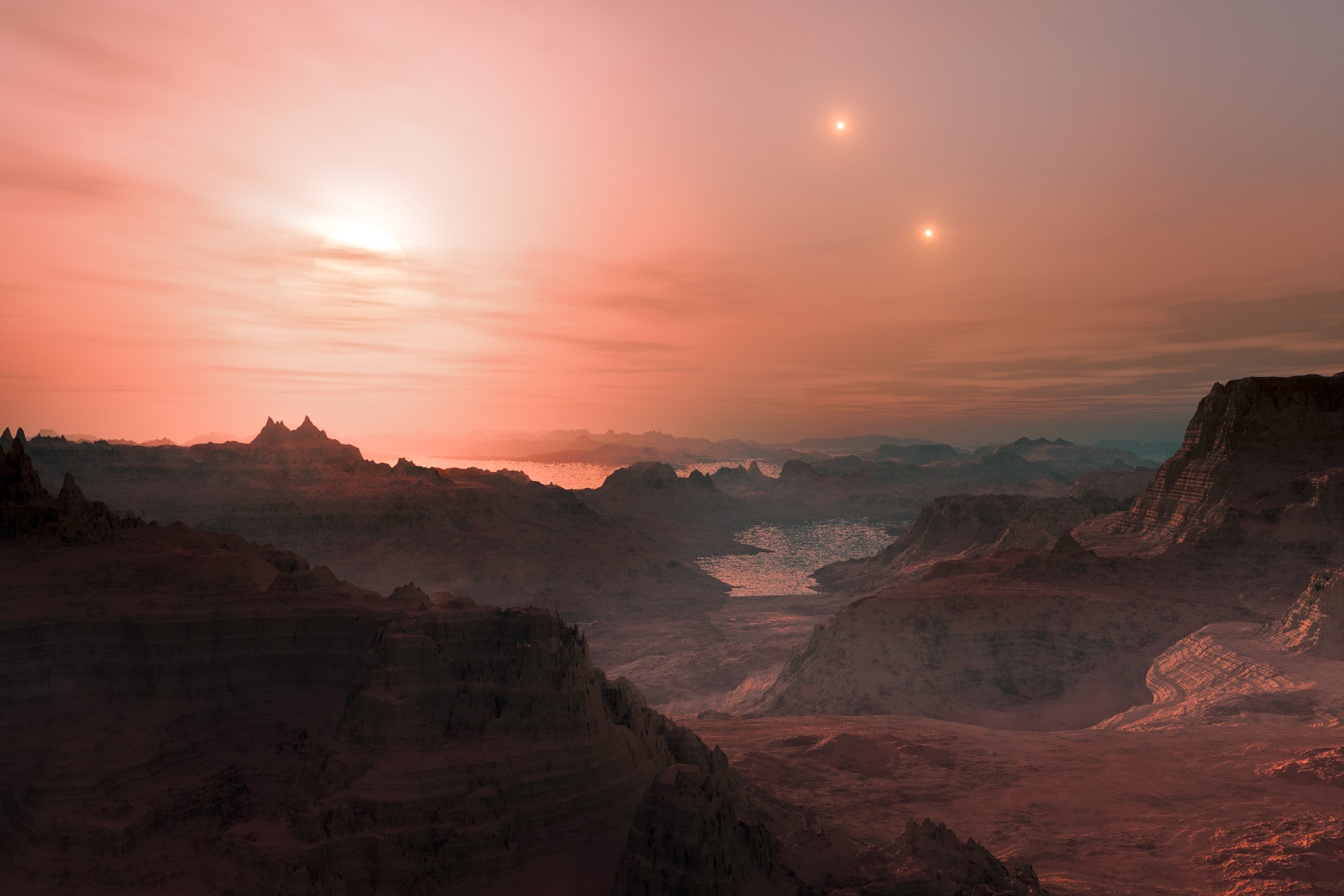
An artist's impression of GJ 667 Cc, a potentially habitable planet orbiting a red dwarf constituent in a trinary star system

Two extrasolar planets, Gliese 667 Cb (GJ 667 Cb) and Cc, have been confirmed orbiting Gliese 667 C by radial velocity measurements of GJ 667. There were also thought to be up to five other potential additional planets; however, it was later shown that they are likely to be artifacts resulting from correlated noise.

Planet Cb was first announced by the European Southern Observatory's HARPS group on 19 October 2009. The announcement was made together with 29 other planets, while Cc was first mentioned by the same group in a pre-print made public on 21 November 2011. Announcement of a refereed journal report came on 2 February 2012 by researchers at the University of Göttingen/Carnegie Institution for Science. In this announcement, GJ 667 Cc was described as one of the best candidates yet found to harbor liquid water, and thus, potentially, support life on its surface. A detailed orbital analysis and refined orbital parameters for Gliese 667 Cc were presented. Based on GJ 667 C's bolometric luminosity, GJ 667 Cc would receive 90% of the light Earth does; however, much of that electromagnetic radiation would be in the invisible infrared light part of the spectrum.

From the surface of Gliese 667 Cc, the second-confirmed planet out that orbits along the middle of the habitable zone, Gliese 667 C would have an angular diameter of 1.24 degrees—2.3 times (Note: $\frac {h} {{h}_{\odot}}={\left( \frac{{{T}_{\odot}}_{\rm eff}} {{T}_{\rm eff}} \right)^2} *\frac{\sqrt{L}} {a}$. where ${h}$ is the angular diameter of the star from the surface of the planet in orbit (GJ667Cc in this case), ${{h}_{\odot}}$ is the angular diameter of the Sun (sol) from the surface of Earth, ${{T}_{\odot}}_{\rm eff}$ is the effective temperature of the Sun (sol), ${{T}_{\rm eff}}$ the effective temperature of the star, ${L}$ is the luminosity of the star as a fraction of the Sun's luminosity and ${a}$ is the distance of the planet from the star in AU. This formula has been used as the luminosity and surface temperature published do not agree with the published radius. If you calculate the radius from the formula $radius=\sqrt(luminosity)/temp^2$ (with all units given in multiples of the Sun's values), you will see that the luminosity and temperature give a radius of 0.286 times the radius of the Sun, not the same figure published in the literature. If you calculate the angular diameter in the sky using a trigonometric formula $atan(distance/radius)*2$, the angular diameter derived using this revised radius agrees with the figures given here, by the shortcut formula above, which essentially makes the same calculation.) larger than the Sun appears from the surface of the Earth, covering 5.4 times more area—but would still only occupy 0.003% of Gliese 667 Cc's sky sphere or 0.006% of the visible sky when directly overhead.

At one point, up to five additional planets were thought to exist in the system, with three of them thought to be relatively certain to exist. However, multiple subsequent studies showed that the other proposed planets in the system were likely to be artifacts of noise and stellar activity, cutting the number of confirmed planets down to two. While one analysis did find some evidence for a third planet, Gliese 667 Cd with a period of about 90 days, but was unable to confirm it, other studies found that that specific signal very likely originates from the stellar rotation. Thus, despite its inclusion in a list of planet candidates in a 2019 preprint (never accepted for publication as of 2024), it is unlikely that Gliese 667 Cd exists.

The Gliese 667 C planetary system
Companion (in order from star)	Mass	Semimajor axis (AU)	Orbital period (days)	Eccentricity	Inclination (°)	Radius
b	≥5.6±0.3 M_{🜨}	0.050431±0.000004	7.1999±0.0009	0.15±0.05	—	—
c	≥4.1±0.6 M_{🜨}	0.12501±0.00009	28.10±0.03	0.27±0.1	—	—

== See also ==
- 41 G. Arae
- List of nearest K-type stars
