= Gliese 667 Cc =

Goldilocks super-Earth orbiting Gliese 667 C

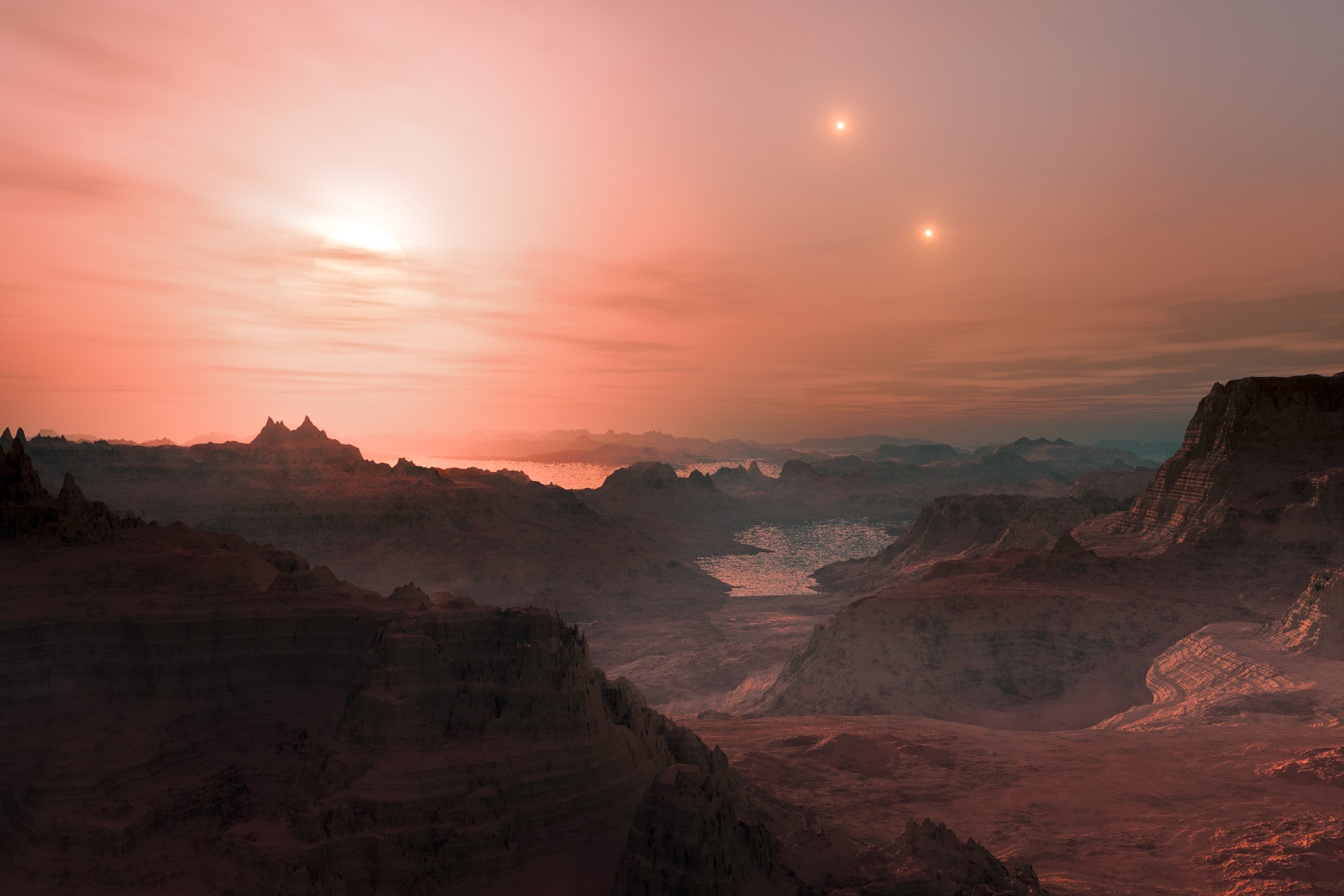
- An artist's impression of the surface of Gliese 667 Cc

Discovery
- Discovery date: 2011 (mentioned), 2012 (announced)
- Detection method: Radial velocity (European Southern Observatory)

Orbital characteristics
- Semi-major axis: 0.1251 (± 0.03) AU
- Eccentricity: 0.133 (± 0.098)
- Orbital period (sidereal): 28.155 (± 0.017) d
- Inclination: >30
- Semi-amplitude: 1.5
- Star: Gliese 667C

Physical characteristics
- Mean radius: ~1.7 R_{🜨}
- Mass: >4.1 M_{🜨}
- Temperature: 277 K (4 °C; 39 °F)

Gliese 667 Cc (also known as GJ 667 Cc, HR 6426 Cc, or HD 156384 Cc) is an exoplanet orbiting within the habitable zone of the red dwarf star Gliese 667 C, which is a member of the Gliese 667 triple-star system, approximately 23.62 light-years (7.24 parsecs; 223.5 trillion kilometres) away in the constellation of Scorpius. The exoplanet was found by using the radial velocity method, from radial-velocity measurements via observation of Doppler shifts in the spectrum of the planet's parent star. Gliese 667 Cc is sometimes considered as the first confirmed potentially habitable exoplanet.

== Physical characteristics ==
=== Mass, radius and temperature ===
Gliese 667 Cc is a super-Earth, an exoplanet with a mass and radius greater than that of Earth, but smaller than that of the giant planets Uranus and Neptune. It is heavier than Earth with a minimum mass of about 3.7 Earth masses. The equilibrium temperature of Gliese 667 Cc is estimated to be 277.4 K (4.3 °C; 39.6 °F). It is expected to have a radius of around 1.5 R_{🜨}, dependent upon its composition.

=== Host star ===
The planet orbits a red dwarf (M-type) star named Gliese 667 C, orbited by two planets. The star is part of a trinary star system, with Gliese 667 A and B both being more massive than the smaller companion. Gliese 667 C has a mass of 0.31 M_{☉} and a radius of 0.42 R_{☉}. It has a temperature of 3,700 K, but its age is poorly constrained, estimates place it greater than two billion years old. In comparison, the Sun is 4.6 billion years old and has a surface temperature of 5,778 K. This star is radiating only 1.4% of the Sun's luminosity from its outer atmosphere. It is known to have a system of two planets: claims have been made for up to seven, but these may be in error due to failure to account for correlated noise in the radial velocity data. Since red dwarfs emit little ultraviolet light, the planets likely receive minimal amounts of ultraviolet radiation.

Gliese 667 Cc is the second confirmed planet out from Gliese 667 C, orbiting towards the inner edge of the habitable zone. From its surface, the star would have an angular diameter of 1.24 degrees and would appear to be 2.3 times (Note: $\begin{smallmatrix}\frac {h} {{h}_{\odot}}={\left( \frac{{{T}_{\odot}}_{\rm eff}} {{T}_{\rm eff}} \right)^2} *\frac{\sqrt{L}} {a}\end{smallmatrix}$. where $\begin{smallmatrix}{h}\end{smallmatrix}$ is the apparent diameter of the star from the surface of the planet in orbit (GJ667Cc in this case), $\begin{smallmatrix}{{h}_{\odot}}\end{smallmatrix}$ is the apparent diameter of the Sun (sol) from the surface of Earth, $\begin{smallmatrix}{{T}_{\odot}}_{\rm eff}\end{smallmatrix}$ is the effective temperature of the Sun (sol), $\begin{smallmatrix}{{T}_{\rm eff}}\end{smallmatrix}$ the effective temperature of the star, $\begin{smallmatrix}{L}\end{smallmatrix}$ is the luminosity of the star as a fraction of the Sun's luminosity and $\begin{smallmatrix}{a}\end{smallmatrix}$ is the distance of the planet from the star in AU.) the visual diameter of the Sun as it appears from the surface of the Earth. Gliese 667 C would have a visual area 5.4 times greater than that of the Sun but would still only occupy 0.003 percent of Gliese 667 Cc's sky sphere or 0.006 percent of the visible sky when directly overhead.

The apparent magnitude of the star is 10.25, giving it an absolute magnitude of about 11.03. It is too dim to be seen from Earth with the naked eye, and even smaller telescopes cannot resolve it against the brighter light from Gliese 667 A and B.

=== Orbit ===
The orbit of Gliese 667 Cc has a semi-major axis of 0.1251 astronomical units, making its year 28.155 Earth-days long. Based on its host star's bolometric luminosity, GJ 667 Cc would receive 90% of the light Earth does; however, a good part of that electromagnetic radiation would be in the invisible infrared part of the spectrum.

The orbit of Gliese 667 Cc is dynamically unstable due to the interactions between the other planets in the system. The eccentricity of its orbit changes every 4.6 years from 0.06–0.28 and 0.05–0.25. Simulations of the planet assuming a terrestrial mantle predicts that Gliese 667 Cc is part of a 3:2 or higher spin-orbit resonance. These simulations also show that the tidal energy of both Gliese 667 Cb and Gliese 667 Cc are 10^{23.7} and 10^{26.7} J yr^{−1} respectively. This means that temperatures on this planet increase by 1.6 Kelvin every one hundred thousand years with at least the mantle being partially melted and is likely completely molten. This means that Gliese 667 Cc quickly becomes a planet covered in lava.

== Habitability ==
Based on black body temperature calculation, Gliese 667 Cc should absorb a similar, but slightly higher, amount of overall electromagnetic radiation than Earth, making it a little warmer (277.4 K [4.3 °C; 39.6 °F]) and consequently placing it slightly closer to the "hot" inner edge of the habitable zone than Earth (254.3 K [−18.8 °C; −1.9 °F]). According to the Planetary Habitability Laboratory (PHL), Gliese 667 Cc is (as of July 2018) the fourth-most Earth-like exoplanet located in the conservative habitable zone of its parent star.

Its host star is a red dwarf, with about a third as much mass as the Sun. As a result, stars like Gliese 667 C may live up to 100–150 billion years, 10–15 times longer than the Sun's lifespan. This, however, does not equate to a longer period of favorable conditions for life. A 2017 paper employed bayesian inference to show that if Earth is assumed to be typical of a habitable planet, then there must be some constraint that prohibits habitability and the evolution of life on planets that orbit stars of less than 0.65 M_{☉}. Given that Gliese 667 Cc orbits a star of mass 0.31 M_{☉}, its chances of habitability may be considerably smaller than estimates based purely on how Earth-like the planet is.

Furthermore, the planet is likely tidally locked, with one side of its hemisphere permanently facing towards the star, and the opposite side being dark and cold. However, between these two intense areas, there could be a sliver of habitability—called the terminator line, where the temperatures may be suitable (about 273 K [0 °C; 32 °F]) for liquid water to exist. Additionally, a much larger portion of the planet may be habitable if it supports a thick enough atmosphere to transfer heat to the side facing away from the star.

However, in a 2013 paper, it was revealed that Gliese 667 Cc is subject to tidal heating 300 times that of Earth. This in part is due to its small eccentric orbit around the host star. Further simulations of the interaction between Gliese 667Cc and Gliese 667Cb show that it would be subjected to intense tidal energies. The energy that it is subjected to would warm the planet up by 1.6 Kelvin every one hundred thousand years causing the partial or complete melting the mantle and covering the surface in lava. Because of this, the chances of habitability are very likely to be lower than originally estimated.

== Discovery ==
Gliese 667 Cc was first announced in a pre-print made public on 21 November 2011 by the European Southern Observatory's High Accuracy Radial Velocity Planet Searcher (HARPS) group using the radial velocity method (Doppler method). The announcement of a refereed journal report came on 2 February 2012 by researchers at the University of Göttingen and the Carnegie Institution for Science and backing up the ESO HARPS group discovery.

== See also ==
- KELT-4Ab – another exoplanet in a triple-star system
- LTT 1445 – a triple M-dwarf system with three planets orbiting LTT 1445A
- List of potentially habitable exoplanets
