= Wolf 1069 b =

Potentially habitable Earth-sized exoplanet

Discovery
- Discovered by: Kossakowski et al.
- Discovery date: January 2020
- Detection method: Radial velocity

Designations
- Alternative names: LHS 3549 b, NLTT 49289 b, GJ 1253 b

Orbital characteristics
- Semi-major axis: 0.0672±0.0014 AU
- Orbital period (sidereal): 15.564±0.015 d
- Star: Wolf 1069

Physical characteristics
- Mean radius: ~1.08 R_{🜨}
- Mass: ≥1.26±0.21 M_{🜨}
- Temperature: 250.1+6.6 −6.5 K (−23+6.6 −6.5 °C)

Wolf 1069 b is an Earth-sized planet orbiting the red dwarf star Wolf 1069. Being located in the habitable zone of its star, Wolf 1069 b is considered a potentially habitable planet, as well as one of the closest Earth-mass planets orbiting in the habitable zone. The minimum mass of the planet, as measured by the radial velocity method, is 1.26 M_{🜨}, while its radius is estimated at 1.08 R_{🜨}. The equilibrium temperature of Wolf 1069 b is −23 °C (250 K).

== Characteristics ==
Located about 9.6 parsecs (31 ly) from Earth, it is one of the closest known exoplanets. The minimum mass of Wolf 1069 b is measured at 1.26±0.21 M_{🜨}— very similar to that of Earth. Its radius is estimated at 1.08 R_{🜨} according to mass-radius relationships.

The planet takes about 16 days to fully orbit Wolf 1069, and is located at an average distance of 0.0672 astronomical units (10,050,000 km) from it, which makes it located in its star's habitable zone.

Wolf 1069 b was discovered using radial velocity data from the CARMENES spectrograph at the Calar Alto Observatory, Spain. Its discovery was announced in January 2023, in the journal Astronomy & Astrophyics.

== Habitability ==
Wolf 1069 b is considered a potentially habitable planet, as it orbits in the conservative habitable zone of its star (located between 0.056 and 0.111 astronomical units), in addition to having a mass similar to that of Earth. It is very likely that Wolf 1069 b has a similar composition to Earth (32.5% of iron and 67.5% of silicate minerals), in addition to probably having liquid water on its surface. Located 31 light-years away, it is one of the closest Earth-mass planets orbiting in the habitable zone of host star.

Its equilibrium temperature is calculated at -23 °C (250 K), and it receives an incident flux from its star equivalent to 65% of what the Earth receives from the Sun.

Despite being considered potentially habitable, the short distance from its star causes Wolf 1069 b to be tidally locked, meaning one side of the planet is always facing its star, while the other is always opposite it. Because it is tidally locked, Wolf 1069 b does not have a day/night cycle like Earth, meaning that one side of the planet is in an eternal day while the other side is in an eternal night. However, if the planet has suitable formation of clouds in the atmosphere, then the difference in temperature between two sides would likely be minimized, thus improving chance of habitability on the planet.

== Host star ==
Wolf 1069 is a red dwarf that is located 31 light-years from Earth in the northern constellation Cygnus. The star has a slow rotation period, rotating on its own axis every 170 days, while the Sun takes 25 days to complete one rotation. Wolf 1069 is much smaller, cooler and less massive than the Sun, having a mass of 0.167 M_{☉}, a surface temperature of 3,158 K (2,885 °C), and a radius of 0.18 R_{☉}, which makes it one of the smallest stars known. It was discovered in 1920 by Max Wolf.

== See also ==
- List of potentially habitable exoplanets
- Cygnus (constellation)
- List of exoplanets discovered in 2023, including Wolf 1069 b
- Red dwarf
- Habitability of red dwarf systems
