= HD 40307 e =

Extrasolar planet in the constellation Pictor

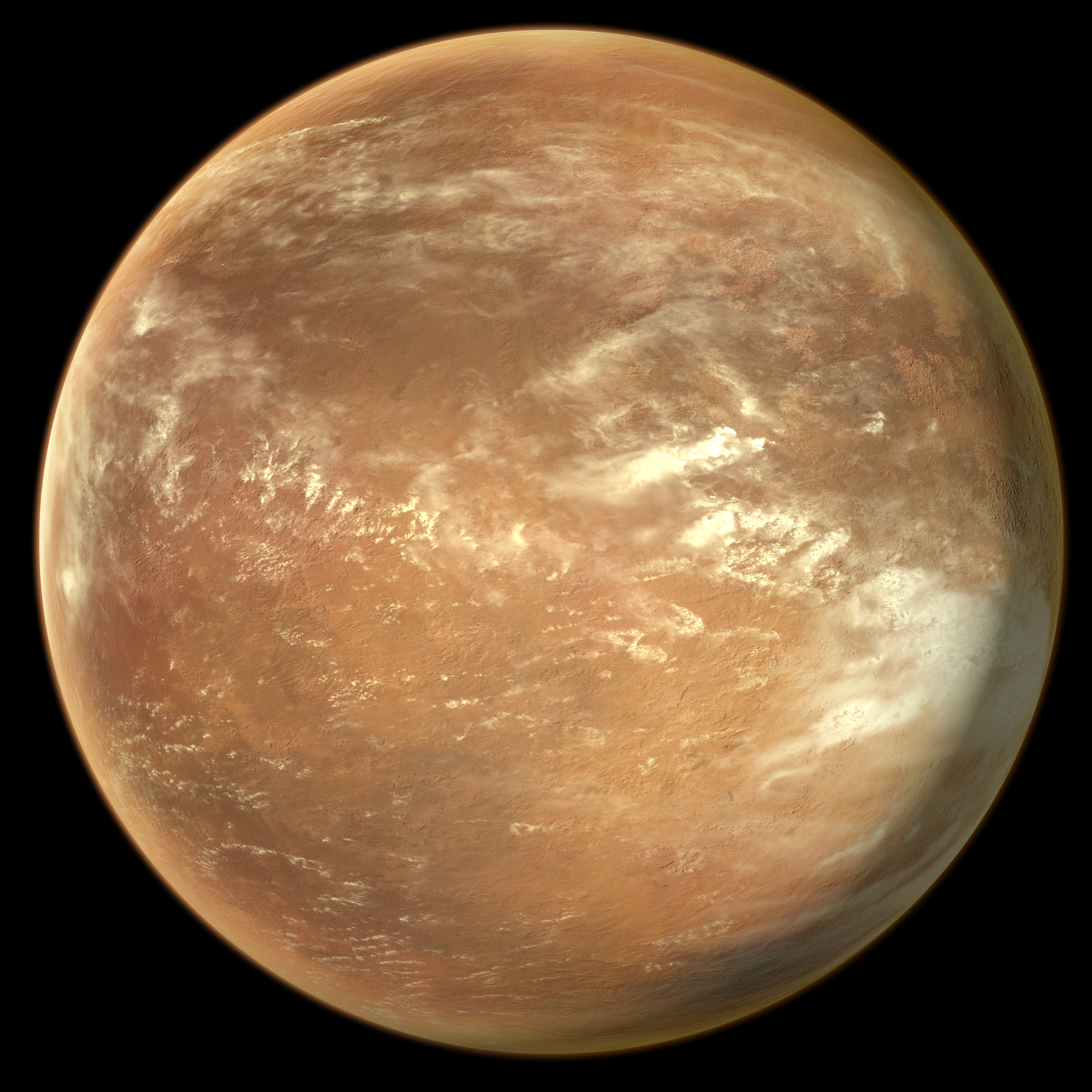
- Artist's depiction of HD 40307 e.

Discovery
- Discovered by: Mikko Tuomi et al.
- Discovery site: La Silla Observatory, Chile
- Discovery date: October 28, 2012
- Detection method: radial velocity, using HARPS

Orbital characteristics
- Semi-major axis: 0.1886 [0.1782, 0.1969] AU
- Eccentricity: 0.06 [0, 0.18]
- Orbital period (sidereal): 34.62 [34.42, 34.83] d
- Semi-amplitude: 0.84 [0.53, 1.16]
- Star: HD 40307

HD 40307 e is an extrasolar planet candidate suspected to be orbiting the star HD 40307. It is located 42 light-years away in the direction of the southern constellation Pictor. The planet was discovered by the radial velocity method, using the European Southern Observatory's HARPS apparatus by a team of astronomers led by Mikko Tuomi at the University of Hertfordshire and Guillem Anglada-Escude of the University of Göttingen, Germany.

The existence of the planet was disputed in 2015, as more Doppler spectroscopy data has become available.

== Planetary characteristics ==
Its minimum mass is 3.5 that of Earth - the smallest - and dynamical models suggest it cannot be much more (and so is measured close to edge-on). It further gets roughly the same insolation from its star as Mercury gets from the Sun. Planets like this in that system have been presumed "super-Earth".

However planets b, c, and d are presumed to have migrated in from outer orbits; and planet b is predicted a sub-Neptune. It is likely that this planet formed even further out. Whether it is a sub-Neptune, a super-Venus or even a super-Mercury is unknown.
