= HD 40307 b =

Extrasolar planet in the constellation Pictor

Discovery
- Discovered by: Mayor et al.
- Discovery site: La Silla Observatory, Chile
- Discovery date: 18 June 2008
- Detection method: radial velocity, using HARPS

Orbital characteristics
- Semi-major axis: 0.0468^{+0.0492}_{−0.0445} AU
- Eccentricity: 0.20^{+0.25}_{−0.04}
- Orbital period (sidereal): 4.3115 ± 0.0006 d
- Semi-amplitude: 1.94^{+2.25}_{−1.67}
- Star: HD 40307

HD 40307 b is an extrasolar planet orbiting the star HD 40307, located 42 light-years away in the direction of the southern constellation Pictor. The planet was discovered by the radial velocity method, using the European Southern Observatory's HARPS apparatus, in June 2008. It is the second smallest of the planets orbiting the star, after HD 40307 e. The planet is of interest as this star has relatively low metallicity, supporting a hypothesis that different metallicities in protostars determine what kind of planets they will form.

== Discovery ==
As with many other extrasolar planets, HD 40307 b was discovered by measuring variations in the radial velocity of the star it orbits. These measurements were made by the High Accuracy Radial Velocity Planet Searcher (HARPS) spectrograph at the Chile-based La Silla Observatory. The discovery was announced at the astrophysics conference that took place in Nantes, France between 16 and 18 June 2008. HD 40307 b was one of three found here at the time.

== Orbit and mass ==
HD 40307 b is the second lightest planet discovered in the system, with at least 4.2 times the mass of the Earth. The planet orbits the star HD 40307 every 4.3 Earth days, corresponding of its location at approximately 0.047 astronomical units from the star. The eccentricity of the planet's orbit was found to not differ significantly from zero, meaning that there is insufficient data to distinguish the orbit from an entirely circular one.

The star around which HD 40307 b orbits has a low metallicity, compared to other planet-bearing stars. This supports a hypothesis concerning the possibility that the metallicity of stars during their births may determine whether a protostar's accretion disk forms gas giants or terrestrial planets.

The Arizonan astronomer Rory Barnes's mathematical model, in 2009, found that "Planet b's orbit must be more than 15◦ from face-on"; however it cannot be much more.

== Characteristics ==
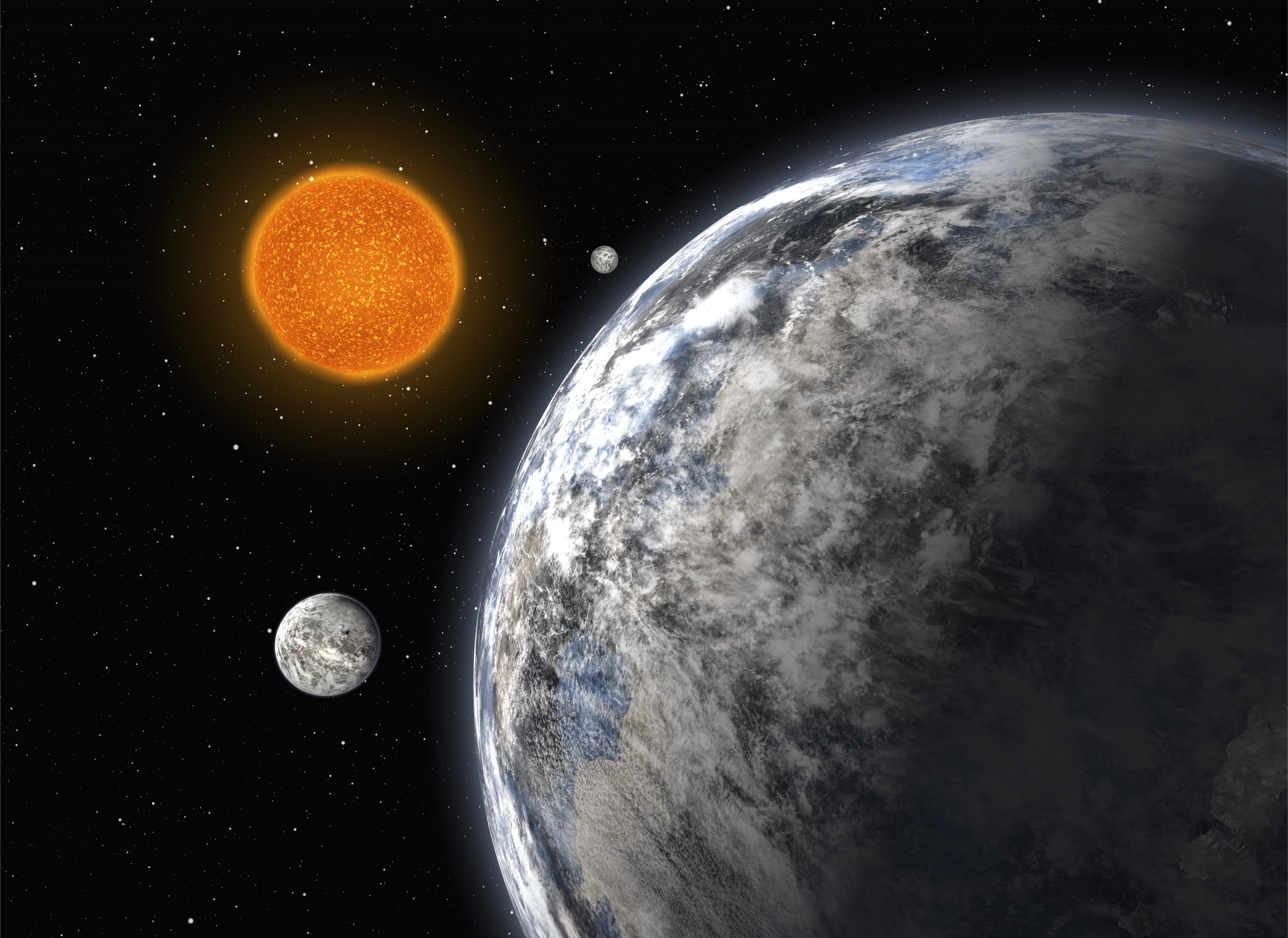
HD 40307 b. Artist impression

HD 40307 b does not transit and has not been imaged. More specific characteristics, such as its radius, composition, and possible surface temperature cannot be determined.

With a lower mass bound of 4.2 times the mass of the Earth, HD 40307 b is presumably too small to be a jovian planet. This concept was challenged in a 2009 study, which stated that if HD 40307 b is terrestrial, the planet would be highly unstable and would be affected by tidal heating in a manner greater than Io, a volcanic satellite of planet Jupiter; restrictions that seem to bind terrestrial planets, however, do not restrict ice giant planets like Neptune or Uranus.

As strong tidal forces often result in the destruction of larger natural satellites in planets orbiting close to a star, it is unlikely that HD 40307 b hosts any satellites.

HD 40307 b, c, and d are presumed to have migrated into their present orbits.

== See also ==
- List of exoplanets
