= Gliese 682 =

Star in the constellation Scorpius

- Location of Gliese 682 in the constellation Scorpius

Observation data Epoch J2000 Equinox ICRS
- Constellation: Scorpius
- Right ascension: 17^{h} 37^{m} 03.6655^{s}
- Declination: −44° 19′ 09.166″
- Apparent magnitude (V): 10.94

Characteristics
- Spectral type: M3.5V
- Apparent magnitude (B): ~12.61
- Apparent magnitude (V): ~10.96
- Apparent magnitude (J): 6.544 ±0.023
- Apparent magnitude (H): 5.917 ±0.038
- Apparent magnitude (K): 5.606 ±0.020

Astrometry
Radial velocity (R_{v})	−34.90±0.30 km/s
Proper motion (μ)	RA: −705.945±0.035 mas/yr Dec.: −938.080±0.021 mas/yr
Parallax (π)	199.6944±0.0312 mas
Distance	16.333 ± 0.003 ly (5.0077 ± 0.0008 pc)
Absolute magnitude (M_{V})	12.4

Details
Mass	0.27 M_{☉}
Radius	0.30 R_{☉}
Luminosity	0.008118 L_{☉}
Surface gravity (log g)	4.95 cgs
Temperature	3,237 K
Metallicity [Fe/H]	0.05±0.09 dex
Rotational velocity (v sin i)	3.42 km/s
Age	6.4±4.3 Gyr

Other designations
- CD−44°11909, GJ 682, HIP 86214, LFT 1358, LHS 451, PLX 3992

Database references
SIMBAD	star
- planet b
- planet c
Exoplanet Archive	data
ARICNS	data

Gliese 682, also known as GJ 682, is a nearby star. It is listed as the 53rd-nearest known star system to the Sun, being 16.3 light years distant. Even though it is close by, as a red dwarf, it is dim with a magnitude of 10.95 and thus requires a telescope to be seen. It is located in the constellation of Scorpius, near the bright star Theta Scorpii. The star is in a crowded region of sky near the Galactic Center, and so appears to be near a number of deep-sky objects from the Solar System's perspective. The star is only 0.5 degrees from the much more distant globular cluster NGC 6388.

== Planetary system ==
Evidence for a giant planet was presented in 2026. Its semi-major axis is very uncertain, somewhere between 0.4 and 70 au, and the mass is somewhere between 0.2 and 10 M_{J}.

The Gliese 682 planetary system
Companion (in order from star)	Mass	Semimajor axis (AU)	Orbital period (days)	Eccentricity	Inclination (°)	Radius
(unconfirmed)	0.58+9.17 −0.42 M_{J}	8.8+61.0 −8.4	—	—	—	—

=== Search for planets ===
Two planets were detected orbiting Gliese 682 in 2014, one of which would be in the habitable zone. A 2020 study did not find these planets and concluded that the radial velocity signals were probably caused by stellar activity.
