= List of stars in Sextans =

This is the list of notable stars in the constellation Sextans, sorted by decreasing apparent magnitude.

Name	B	F	Var	HD	HIP	RA	Dec	vis. mag.	abs. mag.	Dist. (ly)	Sp. class	Notes
α Sex	α	15		87887	49641	10^{h} 07^{m} 56.30^{s}	−00° 22′ 17.9″	4.48	−0.25	287	A0III	
γ Sex	γ	8		85558	48437	09^{h} 52^{m} 30.47^{s}	−08° 06′ 17.7″	5.07	0.55	261	A2V	double star
β Sex	β	30		90994	51437	10^{h} 30^{m} 17.50^{s}	−00° 38′ 13.1″	5.08	−0.04	345	B6V	α^{2} CVn variable, V_{max} = 5^{m}, V_{min} = 5.1^{m}
δ Sex	δ	29		90882	51362	10^{h} 29^{m} 28.73^{s}	−02° 44′ 20.6″	5.19	0.37	300	B9.5V	
ε Sex	ε	22		89254	50414	10^{h} 17^{m} 37.90^{s}	−08° 04′ 08.1″	5.25	1.51	183	F2III	
HD 90362				90362	51046	10^{h} 25^{m} 44.35^{s}	−07° 03′ 36.5″	5.60	0.58	329	M0.5III	suspected variable
18 Sex		18		88333	49865	10^{h} 10^{m} 55.86^{s}	−08° 25′ 06.1″	5.64	−0.17	473	K2III	
HD 84607				84607	47960	09^{h} 46^{m} 23.64^{s}	+01° 47′ 08.5″	5.65	1.03	273	F4IV	
19 Sex		19		88547	50027	10^{h} 12^{m} 48.39^{s}	+04° 36′ 52.9″	5.77	−0.27	527	K0III:	
35 Sex		35		92841	52452	10^{h} 43^{m} 20.91^{s}	+04° 44′ 51.9″	5.77	−0.88	697	K3III+...	double star
41 Sex		41		93903	52980	10^{h} 50^{m} 18.06^{s}	−08° 53′ 51.8″	5.80	0.55	366	A3m	
HD 93833				93833	52948	10^{h} 49^{m} 43.48^{s}	−09° 51′ 09.5″	5.85	0.72	346	G8III:	
HD 85709				85709	48519	09^{h} 53^{m} 42.93^{s}	+05° 57′ 30.8″	5.90	−2.26	1399	M2III	suspected variable, V_{max} = 5.89^{m}, V_{min} = 5.95^{m}
17 Sex		17		88195	49812	10^{h} 10^{m} 07.56^{s}	−08° 24′ 29.4″	5.91	−0.13	527	A1V	
HD 93655				93655	52863	10^{h} 48^{m} 40.57^{s}	−01° 57′ 32.1″	5.92	−0.14	531	M2III	suspected variable
HD 94014				94014	53035	10^{h} 51^{m} 05.44^{s}	−03° 05′ 33.5″	5.95	−0.04	514	K4/5III	
25 Sex		25	SS	90044	50885	10^{h} 23^{m} 26.51^{s}	−04° 04′ 26.6″	5.97	0.77	351	B9p Si(CrSr)	α^{2} CVn variable, V_{max} = 5.94^{m}, V_{min} = 5.98^{m}, P = 4.37 d
6 Sex		6		85364	48341	09^{h} 51^{m} 14.02^{s}	−04° 14′ 35.8″	6.01	2.07	200	A8III	
7 Sex		7		85504	48414	09^{h} 52^{m} 12.27^{s}	+02° 27′ 14.0″	6.02	−1.52	1048	A0Vs	suspected variable, V_{max} = 5.98^{m}, V_{min} = 6.03^{m}
HD 90763				90763	51302	10^{h} 28^{m} 43.96^{s}	−03° 44′ 32.3″	6.05	1.68	244	A1sp...	suspected variable
HD 89033				89033	50292	10^{h} 16^{m} 09.01^{s}	−11° 12′ 12.3″	6.08	−0.39	642	K0	
HD 87262				87262	49293	10^{h} 03^{m} 40.99^{s}	−09° 34′ 25.6″	6.09	−1.84	1259	K0	suspected variable
14 Sex		14		87682	49530	10^{h} 06^{m} 47.44^{s}	+05° 36′ 41.5″	6.20	1.07	345	K1III	
HD 91106				91106	51490	10^{h} 30^{m} 58.78^{s}	−07° 38′ 15.2″	6.20	−0.66	767	K5III+...	
HD 88372				88372	49900	10^{h} 11^{m} 17.76^{s}	−07° 18′ 59.7″	6.23	0.37	484	A2Vn	
4 Sex		4		85217	48273	09^{h} 50^{m} 30.17^{s}	+04° 20′ 37.6″	6.24	2.93	150	F6V...	
33 Sex		33		92588	52316	10^{h} 41^{m} 24.27^{s}	−01° 44′ 28.3″	6.25	3.57	112	K1IV	
36 Sex		36		93102	52584	10^{h} 45^{m} 09.48^{s}	+02° 29′ 16.9″	6.27	−0.19	639	K4III	
HD 89565				89565	50584	10^{h} 19^{m} 59.52^{s}	−09° 03′ 31.8″	6.31	2.68	174	F1IV	
HD 90125				90125	50939	10^{h} 24^{m} 13.15^{s}	+02° 22′ 05.1″	6.33	1.32	328	G9V	
26 Sex		26		90473	51117	10^{h} 26^{m} 36.94^{s}	−00° 59′ 17.1″	6.33	−0.49	755	K0	
HD 85505				85505	48413	09^{h} 52^{m} 12.00^{s}	+00° 04′ 32.4″	6.34	0.75	428	G9III	
HD 89490				89490	50552	10^{h} 19^{m} 32.37^{s}	−05° 06′ 21.5″	6.38	1.61	293	K0	
HD 90057				90057	50893	10^{h} 23^{m} 32.66^{s}	−03° 38′ 34.3″	6.39	−1.45	1203	K5	
HD 85380				85380	48351	09^{h} 51^{m} 21.69^{s}	−06° 10′ 55.4″	6.42	3.18	145	F8V	
HD 86341				86341	48839	09^{h} 57^{m} 43.90^{s}	−01° 56′ 30.4″	6.43	1.79	276	G5	
13 Sex		13		87301	49329	10^{h} 04^{m} 08.48^{s}	+03° 12′ 04.6″	6.43	2.73	179	F4V	
24 Sex		24		90043	50887	10^{h} 23^{m} 28.33^{s}	−00° 54′ 07.8″	6.45	2.08	244	G5	has two planets (b & c)
HD 85461				85461	48375	09^{h} 51^{m} 41.20^{s}	−11° 20′ 25.5″	6.48	−1.03	1035	M2III:	variable star, V_{max} = 6.44^{m}, V_{min} = 6.54^{m}
27 Sex		27		90485	51135	10^{h} 26^{m} 46.90^{s}	−04° 23′ 18.0″	6.55	0.12	629	K0	
34 Sex		34		92749	52401	10^{h} 42^{m} 37.53^{s}	+03° 34′ 58.9″	6.57	2.29	234	F5	suspected variable, V_{max} = 6.5^{m}, V_{min} = 8.0^{m}
40 Sex		40		93742	52913	10^{h} 49^{m} 17.30^{s}	−04° 01′ 26.1″	6.61	1.70	313	A2IV	
23 Sex		23	RS	89688	50684	10^{h} 21^{m} 02.01^{s}	+02° 17′ 23.0″	6.66	−1.99	1753	B2.5IV	β Cep and 53 Per variable, V_{max} = 6.64^{m}, V_{min} = 6.68^{m}, P = 0.1353 d
12 Sex		12		86611	48990	09^{h} 59^{m} 43.12^{s}	+03° 23′ 05.1″	6.69	2.34	241	F0V	
9 Sex		9		85762	48552	09^{h} 54^{m} 06.72^{s}	+04° 56′ 43.4″	6.72	−0.87	1072	K5	variable star, ΔV = 0.010^{m}, P = 0.09138 d
21 Sex		21		88764	50140	10^{h} 14^{m} 08.41^{s}	−07° 59′ 36.4″	6.97	0.39	675	K0	
31 Sex		31		91011	51451	10^{h} 30^{m} 30.96^{s}	+02° 09′ 01.1″	6.98	1.13	482	K0	
20 Sex		20		88697	50100	10^{h} 13^{m} 44.49^{s}	−07° 23′ 02.7″	7.21	3.79	157	F8	
HD 92788				92788	52409	10^{h} 42^{m} 48.0^{s}	−02° 11′ 01″	7.31	4.76	107	G5	has two planets (b & c)
HD 93396				93396	52733	10^{h} 46^{m} 49.79^{s}	−09° 23′ 55.8″	8.04	2.78	368	G8/K0 IV	KELT-11; has a transiting exoplanet (b)
S Sex			S	91637	51791	10^{h} 34^{m} 56.05^{s}	−00° 20′ 33.5″	8.20		3260	M4-5e	Mira variable, V_{max} = 8.2^{m}, V_{min} = 13.7^{m}, P = 264.9 d
HD 86081				86081	48711	09^{h} 56^{m} 05.92^{s}	−03° 48′ 30.3″	8.74	3.94	297	F8V	Bibha; has a planet (b)
HD 93917			VY	93917		10^{h} 50^{m} 29.72^{s}	−02° 41′ 43.1″	9.02		444	F9.5V	W UMa variable, ΔV = 0.269^{m}, P = 0.443433 d
T Sex			T	85675	48503	09^{h} 53^{m} 28.40^{s}	+02° 03′ 26.4″	9.82		1440	A1V	RR Lyr variable, V_{max} = 9.81^{m}, V_{min} = 10.32^{m}, P = 0.324698 d
BD-08°2823					49067	10^{h} 00^{m} 47.72^{s}	−09° 31′ 00.0″	9.86	6.74	137	K3V	has two planets (b & c)
Y Sex			Y	87079	49217	10^{h} 02^{m} 47.96^{s}	+01° 05′ 40.3″	9.95		371	F8V	W UMa variable, V_{max} = 9.81^{m}, V_{min} = 10.23^{m}, P = 0.41982248 d
WASP-127						10^{h} 42^{m} 14.1^{s}	−03° 50′ 06″	10.15			G5	has a transiting planet (b)
TOI-561						09^{h} 52^{m} 44.19^{s}	+06° 12′ 58.9″	10.24		276	G9V	has four transiting planets (b, c, d, e)
RW Sex			RW		50581	10^{h} 19^{m} 56.62^{s}	−08° 41′ 56.1″	10.7		14000	DAe	nova-like star, V_{max} = 10.39^{m}, V_{min} = 10.84^{m}, P = 0.24507 d
WASP-43						10^{h} 19^{m} 38^{s}	−09° 48′ 23″	12.4			K7V	has a transiting planet (b)
PG 1047+003			UY			10^{h} 50^{m} 02.81^{s}	+00° 00′ 36.9″	13.49			sd:B	V361 Hya variable, ΔV = 0.08^{m}
PG 1026+002			UZ			10^{h} 28^{m} 34.88^{s}	−00° 00′ 29.5″	13.83			DA2.9	re-radiating binary star
LHS 292						10^{h} 48^{m} 12.58^{s}	−11° 20′ 08.3″	15.60	17.32	14.75	M6.0V	flare star
FIRST J102347.6+003841			AY			10^{h} 23^{m} 47.68^{s}	+00° 38′ 41.3″	17.26				DQ Her or AM Her variable, V_{max} = 16.37^{m}, V_{min} = 17.90^{m}, P = 0.198094 d
SW Sex			SW			10^{h} 15^{m} 09.39^{s}	−03° 08′ 32.8″				CV	eclipsing binary and nova-like star
Table legend: • Name = Proper name • B = Bayer designation • F or/and G. = Flamsteed designation or Gould designation • Var = Variable star designation • HD = Henry Draper Catalogue designation number • HIP = Hipparcos Catalogue designation number • RA = Right ascension for the Epoch/Equinox J2000.0 • Dec = Declination for the Epoch/Equinox J2000.0 • vis. mag. = visual magnitude (m or m_{v}), also known as apparent magnitude • abs. mag. = absolute magnitude (M_{v}) • Dist. (ly) = Distance in light-years from Earth • Sp. class = Spectral class of the star in the stellar classification system • Notes = Common name(s) or alternate name(s); comments; notable properties [for example: multiple star status, range of variability if it is a variable star, exoplanets, etc.]

== See also ==
- List of stars by constellation
