= Sextans in Chinese astronomy =

According to traditional Chinese uranography, the modern constellation Sextans is located within the southern quadrant of the sky, which is symbolized as The Vermillion Bird of the South (南方朱雀, Nán Fāng Zhū Què).

The name of the western constellation in modern Chinese is 六分仪座 (liù fēn yí zuò), meaning "the six-part apparatus constellation".

== Stars ==
The map of Chinese constellation in constellation Sextans area consists of:

Four Symbols	Mansion (Chinese name)	Romanization	Translation	Asterisms (Chinese name)	Romanization	Translation	Western star name	Chinese star name	Romanization	Translation
Three Enclosures (三垣)	太微垣	Tài Wēi Yuán	Supreme Palace enclosure							
Three Enclosures (三垣)	太微垣	Tài Wēi Yuán	Supreme Palace enclosure	靈台	Língtái	Astronomical Observatory	36 Sex	靈台增二	Língtáizēngèr	2nd additional star
Three Enclosures (三垣)	太微垣	Tài Wēi Yuán	Supreme Palace enclosure	長垣	Chángyuán	Long Wall				
Three Enclosures (三垣)	太微垣	Tài Wēi Yuán	Supreme Palace enclosure	長垣	Chángyuán	Long Wall	32 Sex	長垣增三	Chángyuánzēngsān	3rd additional star
Three Enclosures (三垣)	太微垣	Tài Wēi Yuán	Supreme Palace enclosure	長垣	Chángyuán	Long Wall	23 Sex	長垣增四	Chángyuánzēngsì	4th additional star
Three Enclosures (三垣)	太微垣	Tài Wēi Yuán	Supreme Palace enclosure	長垣	Chángyuán	Long Wall	31 Sex	長垣增五	Chángyuánzēngwǔ	5th additional star
Three Enclosures (三垣)	太微垣	Tài Wēi Yuán	Supreme Palace enclosure	長垣	Chángyuán	Long Wall	34 Sex	長垣增六	Chángyuánzēngliù	6th additional star
Three Enclosures (三垣)	太微垣	Tài Wēi Yuán	Supreme Palace enclosure	長垣	Chángyuán	Long Wall	35 Sex	長垣增七	Chángyuánzēngqī	7th additional star
Vermilion Bird of the South (南方朱雀)	星	Xīng	Star	星	Xīng	Star				
Vermilion Bird of the South (南方朱雀)	星	Xīng	Star	星	Xīng	Star	6 Sex	星宿增九	Xīngsùzēngjiǔ	9th additional star
Vermilion Bird of the South (南方朱雀)	星	Xīng	Star	星	Xīng	Star	3 Sex	星宿增十	Xīngsùzēngshí	10th additional star
Vermilion Bird of the South (南方朱雀)	星	Xīng	Star	星	Xīng	Star	5 Sex	星宿增十一	Xīngsùzēngshíyī	11th additional star
Vermilion Bird of the South (南方朱雀)	星	Xīng	Star	星	Xīng	Star	γ Sex	星宿增十二	Xīngsùzēngshíèr	12th additional star
Vermilion Bird of the South (南方朱雀)	星	Xīng	Star	天相	Tiānxiàng	Celestial Premier				
Vermilion Bird of the South (南方朱雀)	星	Xīng	Star	天相	Tiānxiàng	Celestial Premier	17 Sex	天相一	Tiānxiàngyī	1st star
Vermilion Bird of the South (南方朱雀)	星	Xīng	Star	天相	Tiānxiàng	Celestial Premier	α Sex	天相二	Tiānxiàngèr	2nd star
Vermilion Bird of the South (南方朱雀)	星	Xīng	Star	天相	Tiānxiàng	Celestial Premier	ε Sex	天相三	Tiānxiàngsān	3rd star
Vermilion Bird of the South (南方朱雀)	星	Xīng	Star	天相	Tiānxiàng	Celestial Premier	18 Sex	天相增一	Tiānxiàngzēngyī	1st additional star
Vermilion Bird of the South (南方朱雀)	星	Xīng	Star	天相	Tiānxiàng	Celestial Premier	21 Sex	天相增二	Tiānxiàngzēngèr	2nd additional star
Vermilion Bird of the South (南方朱雀)	星	Xīng	Star	天相	Tiānxiàng	Celestial Premier	20 Sex	天相增三	Tiānxiàngzēngsān	3rd additional star
Vermilion Bird of the South (南方朱雀)	星	Xīng	Star	天相	Tiānxiàng	Celestial Premier	25 Sex	天相增四	Tiānxiàngzēngsì	4th additional star
Vermilion Bird of the South (南方朱雀)	星	Xīng	Star	天相	Tiānxiàng	Celestial Premier	27 Sex	天相增五	Tiānxiàngzēngwǔ	5th additional star
Vermilion Bird of the South (南方朱雀)	星	Xīng	Star	天相	Tiānxiàng	Celestial Premier	δ Sex	天相增六	Tiānxiàngzēngliù	6th additional star
Vermilion Bird of the South (南方朱雀)	星	Xīng	Star	天相	Tiānxiàng	Celestial Premier	24 Sex	天相增八	Tiānxiàngzēngbā	8th additional star
Vermilion Bird of the South (南方朱雀)	星	Xīng	Star	天相	Tiānxiàng	Celestial Premier	26 Sex	天相增九	Tiānxiàngzēngjiǔ	9th additional star
Vermilion Bird of the South (南方朱雀)	星	Xīng	Star	天相	Tiānxiàng	Celestial Premier	β Sex	天相增十	Tiānxiàngzēngshí	10th additional star
Vermilion Bird of the South (南方朱雀)	星	Xīng	Star	天相	Tiānxiàng	Celestial Premier	33 Sex	天相增十一	Tiānxiàngzēngshíyī	11th additional star
Vermilion Bird of the South (南方朱雀)	星	Xīng	Star	天相	Tiānxiàng	Celestial Premier	40 Sex	天相增十二	Tiānxiàngzēngshíèr	12th additional star
Vermilion Bird of the South (南方朱雀)	星	Xīng	Star	軒轅	Xuānyuán	Xuanyuan				
Vermilion Bird of the South (南方朱雀)	星	Xīng	Star	軒轅	Xuānyuán	Xuanyuan	7 Sex	軒轅增四十七	Xuānyuánzēngsìshíqī	47th additional star
Vermilion Bird of the South (南方朱雀)	星	Xīng	Star	軒轅	Xuānyuán	Xuanyuan	4 Sex	軒轅增四十八	Xuānyuánzēngsìshíbā	48th additional star
Vermilion Bird of the South (南方朱雀)	星	Xīng	Star	軒轅	Xuānyuán	Xuanyuan	9 Sex	軒轅增四十九	Xuānyuánzēngsìshíjiǔ	49th additional star
Vermilion Bird of the South (南方朱雀)	星	Xīng	Star	軒轅	Xuānyuán	Xuanyuan	12 Sex	軒轅增五十	Xuānyuánzēngwǔshí	50th additional star
Vermilion Bird of the South (南方朱雀)	星	Xīng	Star	軒轅	Xuānyuán	Xuanyuan	13 Sex	軒轅增五十一	Xuānyuánzēngwǔshíyī	51st additional star
Vermilion Bird of the South (南方朱雀)	星	Xīng	Star	軒轅	Xuānyuán	Xuanyuan	14 Sex	軒轅增五十二	Xuānyuánzēngwǔshíèr	52nd additional star
Vermilion Bird of the South (南方朱雀)	星	Xīng	Star	軒轅	Xuānyuán	Xuanyuan	19 Sex	軒轅增五十三	Xuānyuánzēngwǔshísān	53rd additional star
Vermilion Bird of the South (南方朱雀)	翼	Yì	Wings	翼	Yì	Wings				
Vermilion Bird of the South (南方朱雀)	翼	Yì	Wings	翼	Yì	Wings	HD 93833	翼宿十二	Yìsùshíèr	12th star
Vermilion Bird of the South (南方朱雀)	翼	Yì	Wings	翼	Yì	Wings	41 Sex	翼宿增一	Yìsùzēngyī	1st additional star
Vermilion Bird of the South (南方朱雀)	翼	Yì	Wings	翼	Yì	Wings	39 Sex	翼宿增二	Yìsùzēngèr	2nd additional star

== See also ==
- Traditional Chinese star names
- Chinese constellations
