= NGC 3014 =

Galaxy in Sextans constellation

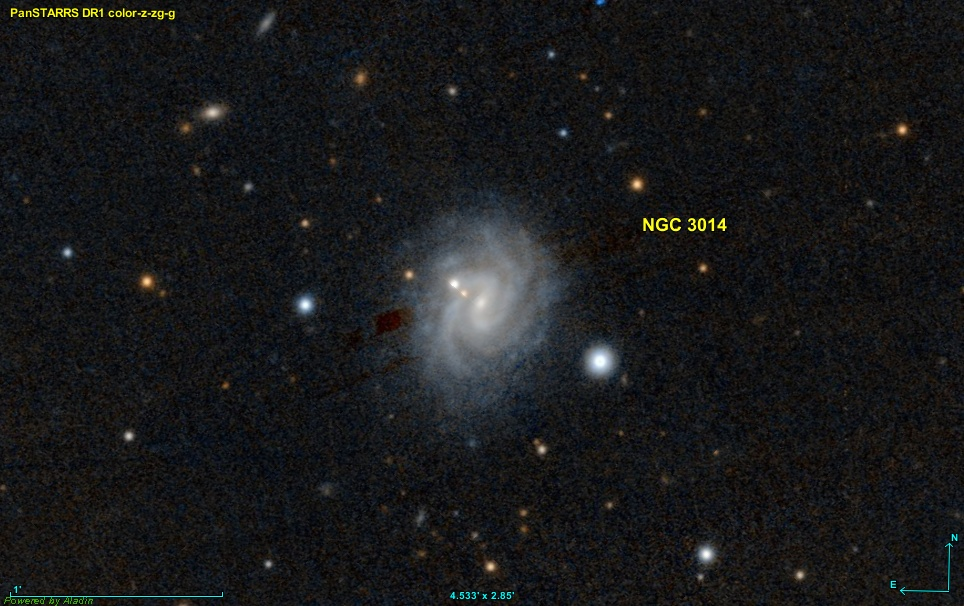
- Image of NGC 3014

Observation data (J2000 epoch)
- Constellation: Sextans
- Right ascension: 9^{h} 49^{m} 7.7755^{s}
- Declination: −4° 44′ 33.713″
- Redshift: 0.021028 ± 0.00000133
- Heliocentric radial velocity: 6304 ± 4 km/s
- Galactocentric velocity: 14km/s
- Distance: 320.0 ± 22.4 Mly (98.10 ± 6.88 Mpc)
- Apparent magnitude (V): 14

Characteristics
- Size: ~311,500 ly (95.50 kpc) (estimated)

Other designations
- 2MASS J09490765-0444345, LEDA 28222, PGC 28222

NGC 3014 (also known as LEDA 28222 ) is a spiral galaxy in the constellation Sextans. It was discovered on February 19, 1830, by John Herschel.

== See also ==
- List of NGC objects (3001-4000)
- List of NGC objects
