= NGC 2980 =

Galaxy in the constellation Sextans

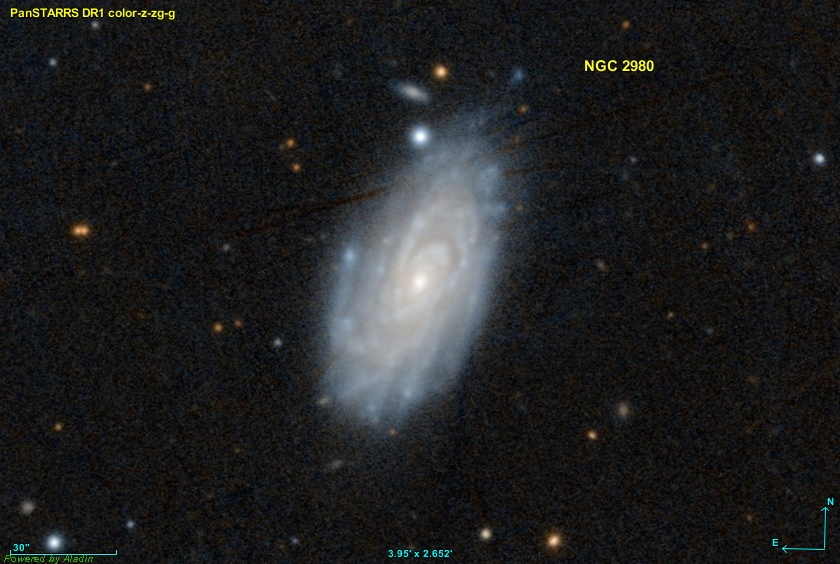
- NGC 2980 imaged by Pan-STARRS

Observation data (J2000 epoch)
- Constellation: Sextans
- Right ascension: 09^{h} 43^{m} 11.9880^{s}
- Declination: −09° 36′ 44.820″
- Redshift: 0.019160±0.0000120
- Heliocentric radial velocity: 5,744±4 km/s
- Distance: 257.99 ± 9.79 Mly (79.100 ± 3.003 Mpc)
- Apparent magnitude (V): 13.6

Characteristics
- Type: SAB(s)c
- Size: ~154,600 ly (47.40 kpc) (estimated)
- Apparent size (V): 1.6′ × 0.9′

Other designations
- IRAS 09407-0923, 2MASX J09431196-0936446, MCG -01-25-028, PGC 27799

NGC 2980 is an intermediate spiral galaxy in the constellation of Sextans. Its velocity with respect to the cosmic microwave background is 6,088±24 km/s, which corresponds to a Hubble distance of 292.9 ± 20.5 Mly (89.79 ± 6.30 Mpc). However, 12 non-redshift measurements give a closer mean distance of 257.99 ± 9.79 Mly (79.100 ± 3.003 Mpc). It was discovered by German-British astronomer William Herschel on 27 March 1786.

NGC 2980 is a Seyfert II galaxy, i.e. it has a quasar-like nucleus with very high surface brightnesses whose spectra reveal strong, high-ionisation emission lines, but unlike quasars, the host galaxy is clearly detectable.

== Supernovae ==
Two supernovae have been observed in NGC 2980:

- SN 2006ba (Type IIb, mag. 18.4) was discovered by Berto Monard on 19 March 2006.
- SN 2009lm (Type II-P, mag. 18.5) was discovered by the Lick Observatory Supernova Search (LOSS) on 17 November 2009.

== See also ==
- List of NGC objects (2001–3000)
