= NGC 3015 =

Lenticular galaxy

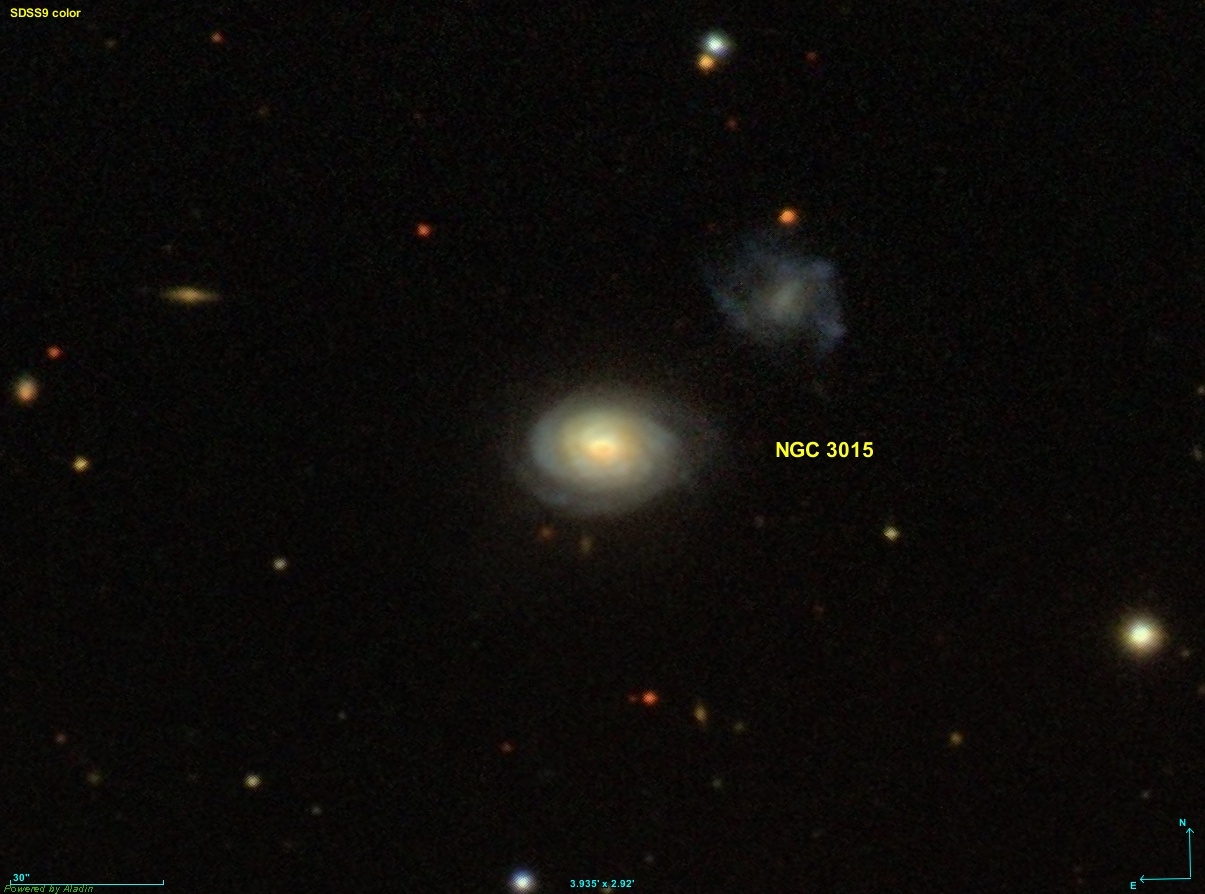
- Image of NGC 1377

Observation data (J2000 epoch)
- Constellation: Sextans
- Right ascension: 9^{h} 49^{m} 22.9379^{s}
- Declination: +11° 08′ 43.425″
- Redshift: 0.025211 ± 0.000000903
- Heliocentric radial velocity: 7558 ± 3 km/s
- Apparent magnitude (V): 14.2

Characteristics
- Type: SAB0^0 pec?
- Size: ~156,000 ly (47.7 kpc) (estimated)

Other designations
- UGC 5261, PGC 28240

NGC 3015 (also known as UGC 5261) is an intermediate spiral galaxy in the constellation Sextans. It was discovered on April 23, 1864 by Albert Marth.

== Supernova ==
One supernova has been observed in NGC 3015: SN 2019vjl (Type II, mag. 17.3) was discovered by ASAS-SN on 23 November 2019.

== See also ==
- List of NGC objects (3001-4000)
- List of NGC objects
