= AzTECC71 =

Dusty star forming galaxy

Observation data (J2000 epoch)
- Constellation: Sextans
- Right ascension: 09^{h} 59^{m} 52.95^{s}
- Declination: +02° 18′ 49.13″
- Redshift: ~5.7
- Distance: 12.9 billion light years (light travel distance)

AzTECC71 is a dusty star-forming galaxy discovered by the James Webb Space Telescope (JWST), reported by NASA in early December 2023. This red ghost-like galaxy has been optically invisible to other telescopes including the Hubble Space Telescope (HST); astronomers referred to them as “Hubble-dark galaxies”.

This object has been identified as a dusty star-forming galaxy by the astronomers with the COSMOS-Web collaboration and the team published its findings in The Astrophysical Journal. “This thing is a real monster,” said Jed McKinney, a postdoctoral researcher at The University of Texas at Austin. “Even though it looks like a little blob, it’s actually forming hundreds of new stars every year. And the fact that even something that extreme is barely visible in the most sensitive imaging from our newest telescope is so exciting to me. It’s potentially telling us there’s a whole population of galaxies that have been hiding from us.”
