= NGC 3117 =

Galaxy in the constellation Triangulum

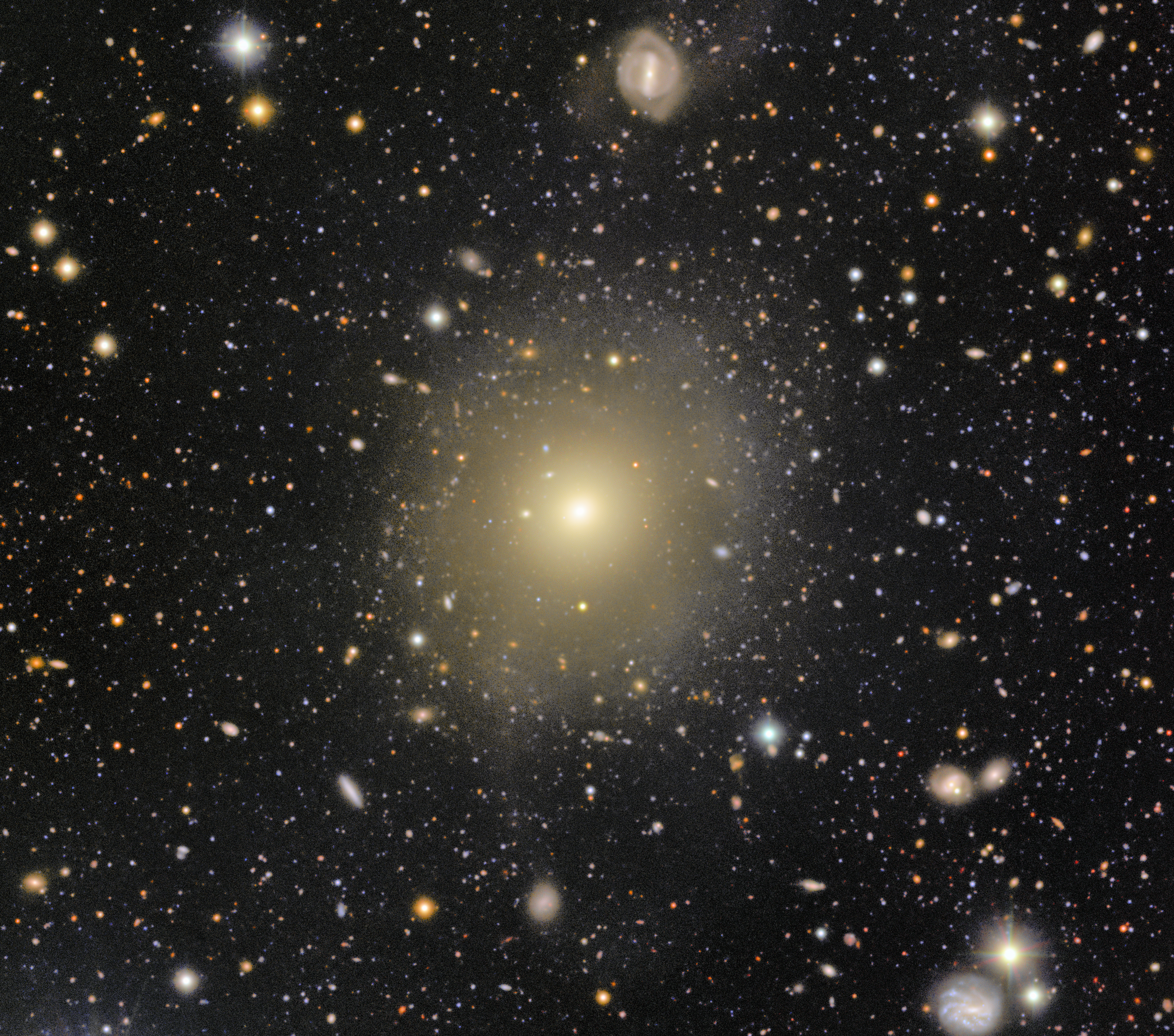
- NGC 3117 imaged by the Vera C. Rubin Observatory

Observation data (J2000 epoch)
- Constellation: Sextans
- Right ascension: 10^{h} 06^{m} 10.5137^{s}
- Declination: +02° 54′ 46.273″
- Redshift: 0.022604±0.00000672
- Heliocentric radial velocity: 6,776±2 km/s
- Distance: 332.68 Mly (102.000 Mpc)
- Group or cluster: LDC 701
- Apparent magnitude (V): 14.3g

Characteristics
- Type: E
- Size: ~112,200 ly (34.39 kpc) (estimated)
- Apparent size (V): 0.98′ × 0.85′

Other designations
- 2MASX J10061053+0254467, UGC 5445, MCG +01-26-014, PGC 29340, CGCG 036-038

NGC 3117 is an elliptical galaxy in the constellation of Sextans. Its velocity with respect to the cosmic microwave background is 7,127±25 km/s, which corresponds to a Hubble distance of 342.9 ± 24.0 Mly (105.12 ± 7.37 Mpc). Additionally, one non-redshift measurement gives a similar distance of 332.68 Mly (102.000 Mpc). It was discovered by French astronomer Édouard Stephan on 15 March 1877.

== LDC 701 group ==
NGC 3117 is a member of a galaxy group known as LDC 701. This group contains 3 galaxies, including IC 588 and Z 36-39.

== See also ==
- List of NGC objects (3001–4000)
