= CID-346 =

Quasar in the constellation Sextans

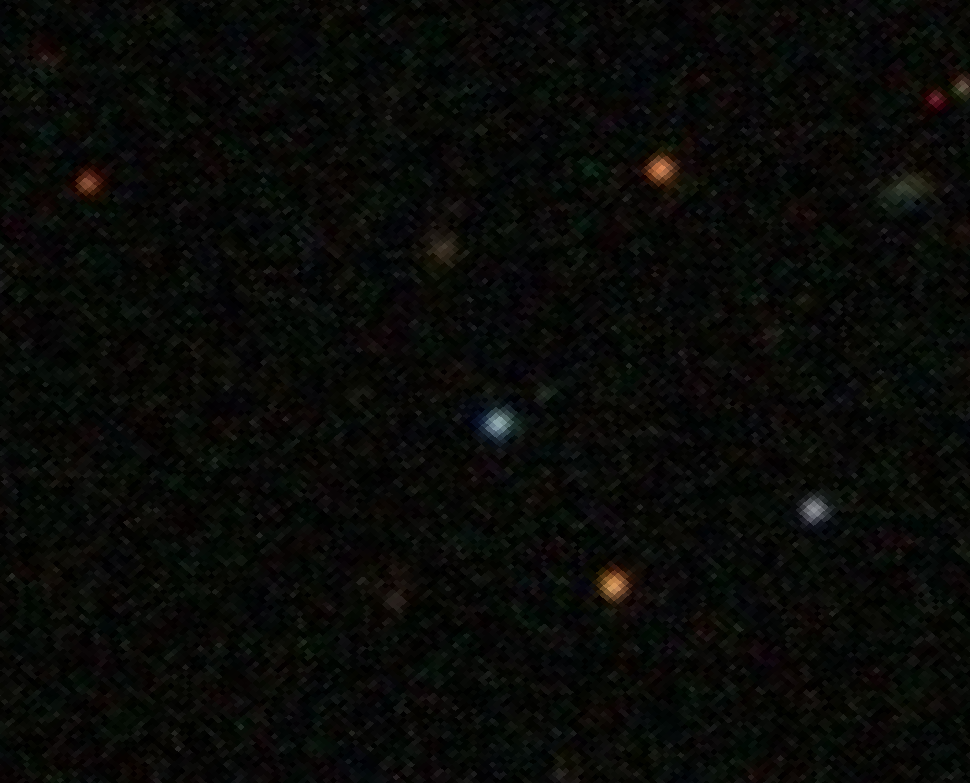
- SDSS image of CID-346

Observation data (J2000.0 epoch)
- Constellation: Sextans
- Right ascension: 09^{h} 59^{m} 43.42^{s}
- Declination: +02° 07′ 07.15″
- Redshift: 2.2227000
- Heliocentric radial velocity: 667638 ± 20 km/s
- Distance: 10.372 Gly
- magnitude (J): 19.32

Characteristics
- Type: Candidate QSO
- Size: ~129,000 ly (39.7 kpc) (estimated)

Other designations
- C-COSMOS 00346, SDSS J095943.41+020707.4, COSMOS:[ECV2009] 00346

CID-346 is a quasar located in the constellation of Sextans. The redshift of the object is (z) 2.22 and it was first discovered in a sample of X-ray active galactic nuclei (AGN) studied by the SINFONI Survey for Unveiling the Physics and Effect of Radiative feedback (SUPER) program in 2018. It is also classified as a broad-line AGN.

== Description ==
CID-346 is found to have a radio structure. When observed through radio imaging, it contains traces of radio emission with hints of an elongated structure located in the southeast direction from the emission region. An image of the source made with Very Large Array (VLA) at 1.4 GHz frequencies detected presence of knot features that extends up to 107 kiloparsecs towards southeast direction. The radio emission is described as extended, suggesting the source as restarted. The total amount of star formation for this quasar is estimated at 362 ± 49 M_{☉} per year.

A molecular halo has been found surrounding CID-346 reaching out to 200 kiloparsecs. When observed, it is found to have a central peak feature offset from the position of its active galactic nucleus and other secondary peak features that are located north, northeast and southeast from the nucleus. There are also detections of hot molecular gas depicted as hot, that reaches a distance of around 16 kiloparsecs. Evidence also found most of the gas (60%) are situated within the active galactic nucleus with the rest of the gas are mainly located within in extended regions. There are also two satellite galaxies located within the position of the quasar.
