= PG 1012+008 =

Seyfert 1 galaxy located in the constellation Sextans

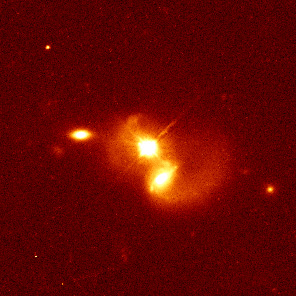
- HST image of PG 1012+008.

Observation data (J2000.0 epoch)
- Constellation: Sextans
- Right ascension: 10^{h} 14^{m} 54.89^{s}
- Declination: +00° 33′ 37.42″
- Redshift: 0.186740
- Heliocentric radial velocity: 55,983 km/s
- Distance: 2.383 Gly
- Apparent magnitude (V): 18.94

Characteristics
- Type: Elliptical Sy1.2
- Size: 107.77 kiloparsecs (351,500 light-years) (diameter; 2MASS K-band total isophote)

Other designations
- 2MASX J10145490+0033375, 2dFGRS N357Z241, LEDA 3115631, RX J1014.9+0033, SDSS J101454.90+003337.3, HE 1012+0048, UVQS J101454.90+003337.4, 1AXG J101455.6+003349

PG 1012+008 is a Seyfert 1 galaxy located in the constellation of Sextans. The redshift for this object is (z) 0.186 and it was first discovered in 1984 by astronomers who classified it as a low-redshift quasar displaying several absorption lines in its spectrum.

== Description ==
PG 1012+008 is classified as a radio-quiet quasar. Its host is described as a large elliptical galaxy based on a best-fit of its one-dimensional profile. Imaging by the Hubble Space Telescope showed it is also merging with its companion galaxy, with their nuclei estimated to be 6.7 kiloparsecs away from each other. There is a smaller compact galaxy located 12.4 kiloparsecs north from the pair, with evidence suggesting it is also taking part in the interaction process as well. The black hole mass of the galaxy is estimated to be 8.42 M_{☉} based on both velocity and size measurements of the broad-line region, with a total magnitude of -23.26.

The radio structure of the galaxy is compact. High-sensitivity radio imaging made by the Very Large Array have found the source is mainly made up of a central nuclear point source with a long jet towards the southeast. The jet itself appears to display a bend to the east based on both comparisons of the outer and inner isotopes. Optical imaging also showed the same structure indicating it and the gas from the narrow-line region are immediately connecting with each other. B-array mapping showed no evidence of extensional features although there is a prominent short extension northwest.

Observations noted the central active galactic nucleus of the galaxy is powering outflows. It has a blue asymmetry which becomes red when reaching south of the nucleus, an indication of material flowing in the direction of southeast. There is also a blue component described as displaced nearly by 1000 kilometers per second, suggesting the outflow is fast.

The galaxy displays a narrow-line region described as having a pear-shaped morphology. When observed, the radio emission is mainly dominated by a central point source showing a slight deviation. The narrow-line region is also described as spatially weak upon reaching 6 kiloparsecs from the center indicating it has a large extent. The full width at half maximum velocity of the region line profile is estimated as 1,050 kilometers per second, with the doubly ionized oxygen emission described narrower when comparing to the emission located in the central spectrum. This suggests an unresolved outflowing component.
