= NGC 3044 =

Galaxy in the constellation Sextans

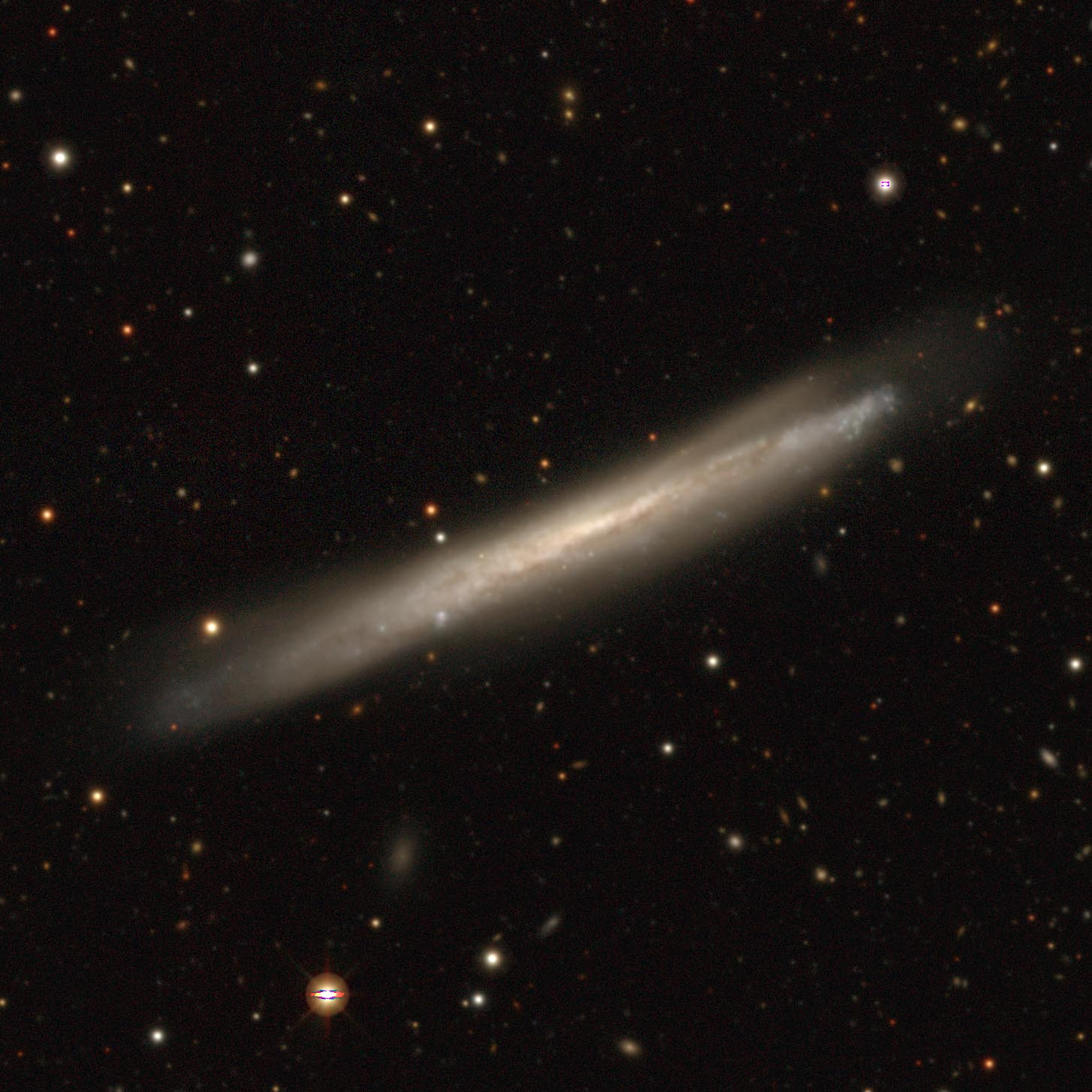
- legacy surveys image of NGC 3044

Observation data (J2000 epoch)
- Constellation: Sextans
- Right ascension: 09^{h} 53^{m} 40.884^{s}
- Declination: +01° 34′ 46.74″
- Heliocentric radial velocity: 1,289 km/s
- Galactocentric velocity: 1,130 km/s
- Distance: 67 Mly (20.6 Mpc)
- Group or cluster: Leo Cloud
- Apparent magnitude (V): 12.5
- Apparent magnitude (B): 12.4

Characteristics
- Type: SBc
- Mass: 6.4×10^{10} M_{☉}
- Notable features: Edge-on galaxy

Other designations
- IRAS 09511+0148, 2MASX J09534088+0134467, UGC 5311, LEDA 28517, MCG +00-25-031, PGC 28517, CGCG 007-056

NGC 3044 is a barred spiral galaxy in the equatorial constellation of Sextans. It was discovered on December 13, 1784, by German-born English astronomer William Herschel. In 1888, Danish astronomer J. L. E. Dreyer described it as "very faint, very large, very much extended 122°". It is located at an estimated distance of 67 million light years. In the B band of the UBV photometric system, the galaxy spans 4.70′ by 0.80′ with the major axis aligned along a position angle of 113°. It is a relatively isolated galaxy with no nearby companions. R. B. Tully in 1988 assigned it as a member of the widely displaced Leo Cloud.

The morphological classification of NGC 3044 is SBc, indicating a barred spiral (SB) with somewhat loosely-wound spiral arms (c). It is being viewed edge-on, with a galactic plane that is inclined at an angle of 79°±4° to the plane of the sky. The disk appears lob-sided and disturbed, suggesting a recent merger or interaction. There is a diffuse ionized gas extending to 1 kpc above the center of the plane.

The stars in the galaxy have a combined mass of approximately 1.01×10^{10} M_{☉}, and the star formation rate is 2.77 M_{☉}·yr^{–1}. The total mass of the atomic gas in this galaxy is 3.5×10^{9} M_{☉}, and it has a dust mass of 1.6×10^{8} M_{☉}. The galaxy as a whole has a dynamic mass of 6.4×10^{10} M_{☉}.

== Supernova ==
One supernova has been observed in NGC 3044: SN 1983E (Type II, mag. 14) was discovered by Natalʹja Metlova on 13 March 1983, at an offset 29″ east, 11″ south of the galaxy.
