= NGC 3062 =

Galaxy in the constellation Triangulum

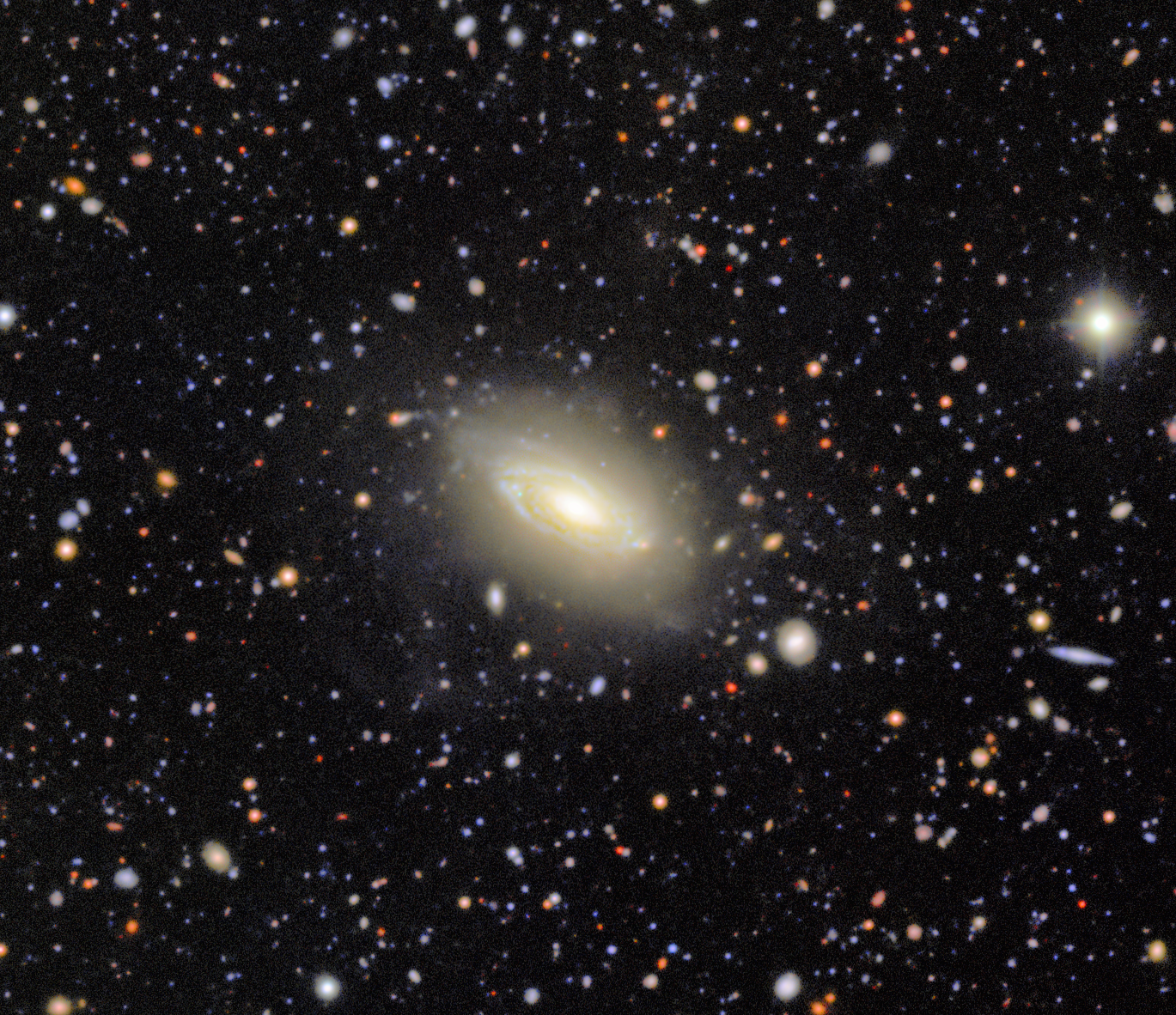
- NGC 3062 imaged by the Vera C. Rubin Observatory

Observation data (J2000 epoch)
- Constellation: Sextans
- Right ascension: 09^{h} 56^{m} 35.7961^{s}
- Declination: +01° 25′ 42.814″
- Redshift: 0.027438±0.00000688
- Heliocentric radial velocity: 8,226±2 km/s
- Distance: 412.4 ± 28.9 Mly (126.44 ± 8.86 Mpc)
- Apparent magnitude (V): 14.9g

Characteristics
- Type: Sb
- Size: ~105,500 ly (32.36 kpc) (estimated)
- Apparent size (V): 0.80′ × 0.44′

Other designations
- IRAS F09539+0139, 2MASX J09563578+0125425, PGC 28699, CGCG 008-002

NGC 3062 is a spiral galaxy in the constellation of Sextans. Its velocity with respect to the cosmic microwave background is 8,573±24 km/s, which corresponds to a Hubble distance of 412.4 ± 28.9 Mly (126.44 ± 8.86 Mpc). It was discovered by German astronomer Albert Marth on 30 April 1864.

NGC 3062 is a LINER galaxy, i.e. a galaxy whose nucleus has an emission spectrum characterized by broad lines of weakly ionized atoms.

== See also ==
- List of NGC objects (3001–4000)
