= PGC 3092152 =

Galaxy in the constellation Sextans

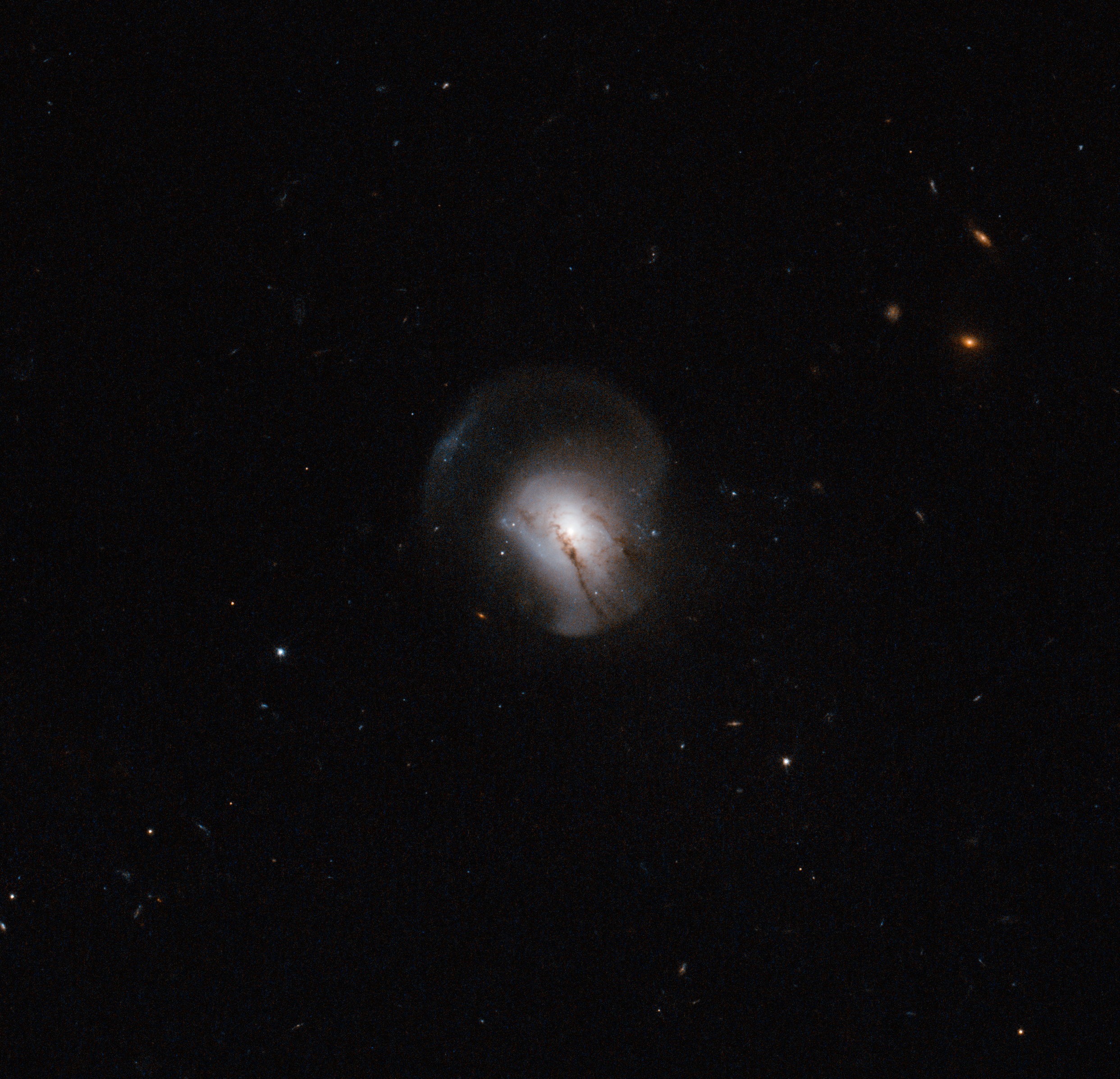
- Hubble Space Telescope image of PGC 3092152

Observation data (J2000 epoch)
- Constellation: Sextans
- Right ascension: 09^{h} 44^{m} 26.9671^{s}
- Declination: +04° 29′ 57.648″
- Redshift: 0.046705
- Heliocentric radial velocity: 14,002 km/s
- Distance: 655 Mly (200.8 Mpc)
- Apparent magnitude (V): 16.1

Characteristics
- Type: S0
- Size: 75,000 ly

Other designations
- LEDA 3092152, 2MASX J09442693+0429569, NSA 017047, NPM1G +04.0217, 2MASS J09442695+0429569, SDSS J094426.96+042956.8, ASK 094701.0, SSTSL2 J094426.95+042956.9

PGC 3092152 or known as 2MASX J09442693+0429569, is a type S0 lenticular galaxy located in the constellation of Sextans. It is located 655 million light-years from the Solar System and has an approximate diameter of 75,000 light-years.

== Characteristics ==
PGC 3092152 is a recent galaxy merger with a tail-like feature extending from it. Because the Universe ages, galaxy-galaxy interactions have occurred and caused the stellar component of galactic discs to be disrupted to the point it enhances the star formation rate. Molecular components are disrupted as well, leading to a magnitude increase in star formation efficiency with more production of massive stars. The galaxy merger causes the gas supply to be used up causing no new stars to be formed leaving the current star population to become older as the merged galaxy creeps into old age. PGC 3092152 is an example which marks a transitional phrase from a young, star-forming galaxy to become a massive, red and dead galaxy.

One of the possible reasons why star formation stopped, might be an overfed black hole. Like most galaxies, PGC 3092152 has a supermassive black hole – a powerful beast millions to billions more massive than the sun. During the galaxy merger, gas and dust are driven to the center to make young stars and feed the growing black hole. The sudden burst of activity creates an unstable environment causing shockwaves to swept through the galaxy. It ejects large quantities of gas which is sufficiently powerful enough to hinder the galaxy's ability to make new stars like in this case of PGC 3092152.
