= J1010+0612 =

Type 2 quasar in the constellation Sextans

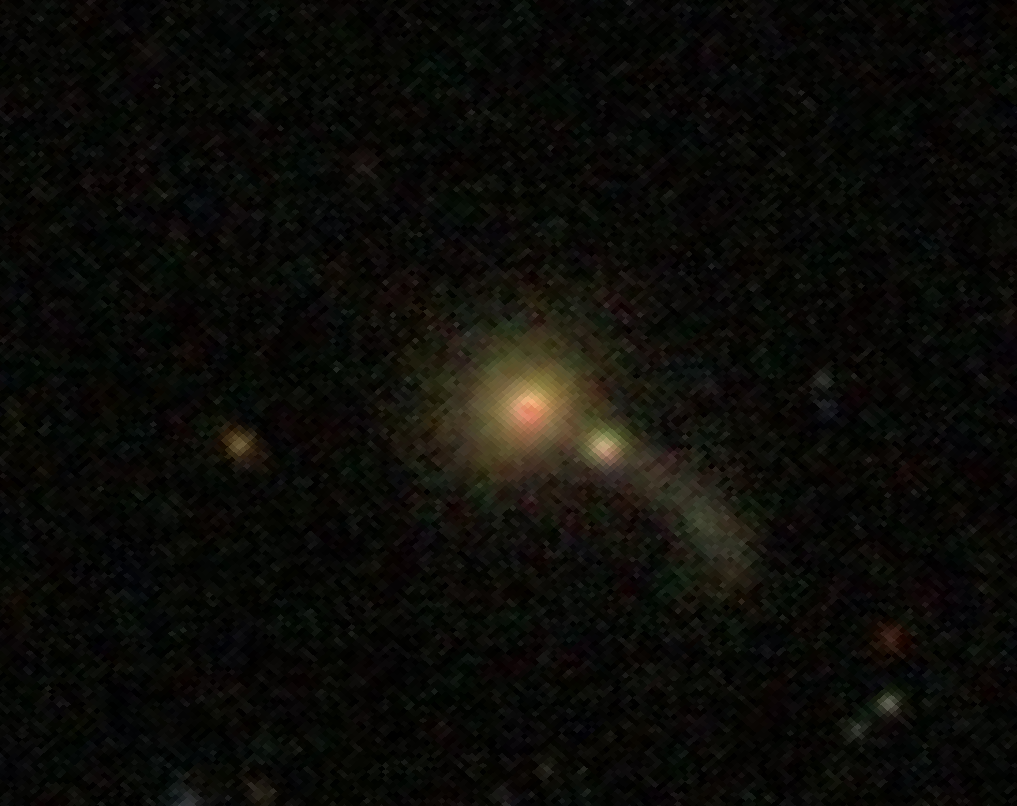
- SDSS image of J1010+0612

Observation data (J2000.0 epoch)
- Constellation: Sextans
- Right ascension: 10^{h} 10^{m} 43.35^{s}
- Declination: +06° 12′ 01.41″
- Redshift: 0.097749
- Heliocentric radial velocity: 29,304 km/s ± 7
- Distance: 1.339 Gly
- Apparent magnitude (V): 17.87

Characteristics
- Type: QSO2
- Size: ~230,000 ly (70.5 kpc) (estimated)

Other designations
- IRAS 10080+0627, 2MASS J10104334+0612013, NVSS J101043+061201, SDSS J101042.59+061157.0 LEDA 1296344

J1010+0612 also known as SDSS J101043.36+061201.4 is a radio-quiet type 2 quasar with an active galactic nucleus, located in the constellation of Sextans. The redshift of the galaxy is (z) 0.097 and it was first discovered by astronomers in December 2008.

== Description ==
J1010+0612 is classified as an early-type galaxy of type S0a based on optical imaging. It is interacting with a small companion that is located 13 kiloparsecs southwest from its position. The total star formation rate of the galaxy is estimated to be 30 M_{☉} per year based on its infrared luminosity. The radio morphology is compact, with a rounded nuclear component, whose total major axis is estimated to be 200 parsecs and at position angle 180° based on radio imaging made by the Very Large Array at 6 GHz frequencies.

The carbon monoxide emission of the galaxy has a total radius of 2.4 kiloparsecs. There is a double structure present with a separation gap of 1.25 kiloparsecs between the peaks that are located in east to west. A dust lane is also present in the galaxy, located in a southwest direction from the central reddened nucleus.

Studies have found there is a rotating disk of doubly ionized oxygen described as compact, with the major axis being -61°. There are broad wing features that have full width at half maximum of 1000 to 1200 kilometers per seconds and are blueshifted by -100 kilometers per second. Broad emission lines have also been discovered in the northwest direction. Further studies in 2024 have also discovered the line emission is mainly limited to an area of between seven and eight kiloparsecs from the nucleus position, and even beyond where the flux emission becomes faint. Kinematic hydrogen-alpha mapping has shown the emission is blueshifted southeast from the nucleus, with the velocity found closer to 50 kilometers per seconds from the northwest. The companion is being ionized by the emission. H_{2} rotation lines and polycyclic aromatic hydrocarbon emission have been detected in the galaxy as well.
