= NGC 3035 =

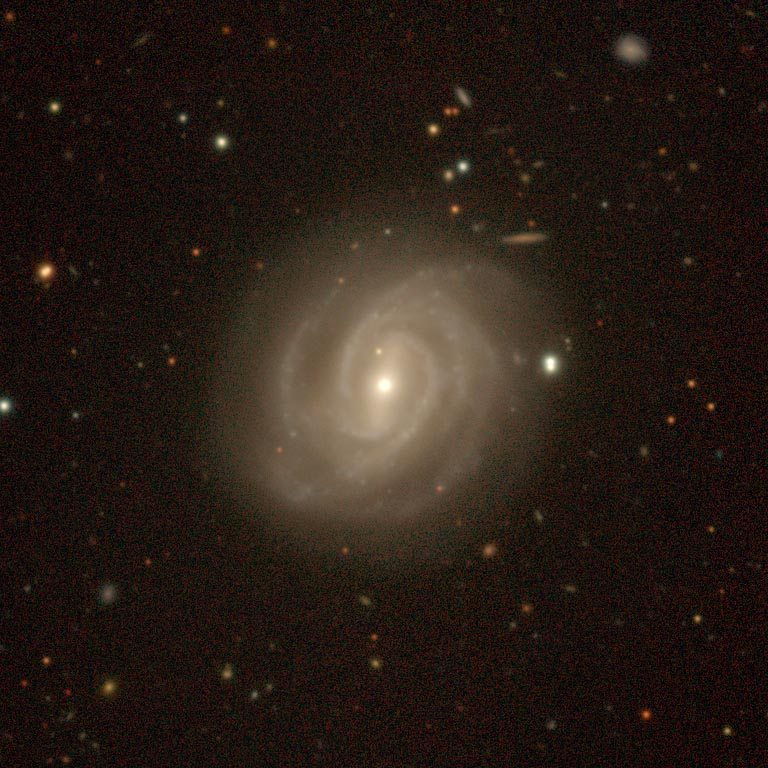
- Image of NGC 3035

Observation data (J2000 epoch)
- Constellation: Sextans
- Right ascension: 09^{h} 51^{m} 55.0280^{s}
- Declination: −06° 49′ 22.517″
- Redshift: 0.014523 ± 0.0000033
- Heliocentric radial velocity: 4354 ± 10 km/s
- Apparent magnitude (V): 13.5

Characteristics
- Type: SB(rs)bc
- Size: ~359,000 ly (110.1 kpc) (estimated)

Other designations
- 2MASX J09515502-0649225, PGC 28415

NGC 3035 (also known as PGC 28415) is a spiral galaxy in the constellation Sextans. It was discovered March 5, 1880 by Édouard Stephan

== See also ==
- List of NGC objects (3001-4000)
- List of NGC objects
