= HD 85709 =

Suspected variable in Sextans

- Location of HD 85709 on the map (circled)

Observation data Epoch J2000.0 Equinox J2000.0 (ICRS)
- Constellation: Sextans
- Right ascension: 09^{h} 53^{m} 42.92424^{s}
- Declination: +05° 57′ 30.8742″
- Apparent magnitude (V): 5.95 (5.89 - 5.95)

Characteristics
- Evolutionary stage: AGB
- Spectral type: M2.5 III
- U−B color index: +1.93
- B−V color index: +1.66
- Variable type: suspected

Astrometry
Radial velocity (R_{v})	−0.66±0.40 km/s
Proper motion (μ)	RA: −3.026 mas/yr Dec.: +1.315 mas/yr
Parallax (π)	2.9474±0.107 mas
Distance	1,110 ± 40 ly (340 ± 10 pc)
Absolute magnitude (M_{V})	−1.30

Details
Radius	133±7 R_{☉}
Luminosity	1,918±144 L_{☉}
Surface gravity (log g)	0.469 cgs
Temperature	3,622±125 K
Metallicity [Fe/H]	+0.23 dex

Other designations
- 14 G. Sextantis, NSV 18292, AG+06°1262, BD+06°2224, GC 13608, HD 85709, HIP 48519, HR 3915, SAO 117975

Database references
SIMBAD	data

HD 85709 (HR 3915; 14 G. Sextantis; NSV 18292) is a solitary star located in the equatorial constellation Sextans. It is faintly visible to the naked eye as a red-hued point of light with an apparent magnitude of 5.95. The object is located relatively far at a distance of 1,100 light-years based on Gaia DR3 parallax measurements but it is slowly drifting closer with a heliocentric radial velocity of −0.66 km/s. At its current distance, HD 85709's brightness is diminished with an interstellar extinction of two-tenths of a magnitude and it has an absolute magnitude of −1.30.

HD 85709 has a stellar classification of M2.5 III, indicating that it is an evolved M-type giant star. It is currently on the asymptotic giant branch, the point where it is generating energy via the fusion of hydrogen and helium shells around an inert carbon core. Having expanded to 133 times the radius of the Sun, it now radiates 1,918 times the luminosity of the Sun from its enlarged photosphere at an effective temperature of 3,622 K. HD 85709 is metal enriched with an iron abundance 1.58 times that of the Sun's.

In 1991, astronomer V.G. Kornilov and colleagues observed that HD 85709 fluctuated between magnitudes 5.89 and 5.95 in optical light during a photometry survey. As of 2004 however, its variability has not been confirmed.
