= HD 84607 =

F-type subgiant; Sextans

- Location of HD 84607 on the map (circled)

Observation data Epoch J2000.0 Equinox J2000.0 (ICRS)
- Constellation: Sextans
- Right ascension: 09^{h} 46^{m} 23.61048^{s}
- Declination: +01° 47′ 08.1160″
- Apparent magnitude (V): 5.64±0.01

Characteristics
- Spectral type: F0/2 IV
- U−B color index: +0.12
- B−V color index: +0.34

Astrometry
Radial velocity (R_{v})	7.8±0.3 km/s
Proper motion (μ)	RA: −55.710 mas/yr Dec.: −40.437 mas/yr
Parallax (π)	13.0508±0.0651 mas
Distance	250 ± 1 ly (76.6 ± 0.4 pc)
Absolute magnitude (M_{V})	+1.12

Details
Mass	2.01 M_{☉}
Radius	3.43±0.17 R_{☉}
Luminosity	26.29^{+0.34}_{−0.31} L_{☉}
Surface gravity (log g)	3.61±0.08 cgs
Temperature	6,919±111 K
Metallicity [Fe/H]	+0.14 dex
Rotation	1.51 d
Rotational velocity (v sin i)	93.1±4.7 km/s
Age	1.06 Gyr

Other designations
- 1 G. Sextantis, AG+02°1299, BD+02°2246, FK5 2782, GC 13459, HD 84607, HIP 47960, HR 3879, SAO 117901, TIC 455274792

Database references
SIMBAD	data

HD 84607 (HR 3879; 1 G. Sextantis) is a solitary star located in the equatorial constellation Sextans. It is faintly visible to the naked eye as a yellowish-white hued point of light with an apparent magnitude of 5.64. The object is located relatively close at a distance of 250 light-years based on Gaia DR3 parallax measurements, but it is receding with a heliocentric radial velocity of 7.8 km/s. At its current distance, HD 84607's brightness is diminished by an interstellar extinction of 0.18 magnitudes and it has an absolute magnitude +1.12.

HD 84607 has a stellar classification of F0/2 IV, indicating that it is a slightly evolved star with the characteristics of a F0 and F2 subgiant. At the age of 1.06 billion years, the star is ceasing hydrogen fusion at its core and is cooling and expanding onto the red giant branch. It has 2.01 times the mass of the Sun and a slightly enlarged radius 3.43 times that of the Sun. It radiates 26.29 times the luminosity of the Sun from its photosphere at an effective temperature of 6,919 K. HD 84607 is metal enriched with an iron abundance of [Fe/H] = +0.14 or 138% of the Sun's and it spins fairly quickly with a projected rotational velocity of 93.1 km/s within 1.51 days.
