= HD 90362 =

Suspected variable star; Sextans

- Location of HD 90362 on the map (circled)

Observation data Epoch J2000 Equinox ICRS
- Constellation: Sextans
- Right ascension: 10^{h} 25^{m} 44.27091^{s}
- Declination: −07° 03′ 35.3764″
- Apparent magnitude (V): 5.56

Characteristics
- Evolutionary stage: AGB
- Spectral type: K6 III Fe −0.5
- U−B color index: +1.86
- B−V color index: +1.53
- Variable type: suspected

Astrometry
| Radial velocity (R_{v}) | 35.60±0.25 km/s |
| Proper motion (μ) | RA: −135.763 mas/yr Dec.: +130.341 mas/yr |
| Parallax (π) | 7.127±0.1702 mas |
| Distance | 460 ± 10 ly (140 ± 3 pc) |
| Absolute magnitude (M_{V}) | +0.19 |

Details
| Mass | 0.44±0.14 M_{☉} |
| Radius | 41.1±2.1 R_{☉} |
| Luminosity | 252±9 L_{☉} |
| Surface gravity (log g) | 0.96^{+0.02}_{−0.03} cgs |
| Temperature | 3,804 K |
| Metallicity [Fe/H] | −0.10±0.05 dex |
| Rotational velocity (v sin i) | 1.5±1.0 km/s |
| Age | 11.0^{+1.9}_{−1.6} Gyr |

Other designations
- 47 G. Sextantis, NSV 18399, BD−06°3146, FK5 2836, GC 14321, HD 90362, HIP 51046, HR 4092, SAO 137557, CCDM J10258-0704A, WDS J10257-0704A, TIC 36881111

Database references
| SIMBAD | data |

HD 90362 (HR 4092; 47 G. Sextantis) is a solitary star located in the equatorial constellation of Sextans. It is faintly visible to the naked eye as a redish-orange-hued point of light with an apparent magnitude of 5.56. Gaia DR3 parallax measurements imply a distance of approximately 460 light-years and it is receding with a heliocentric radial velocity of 35.6 km/s. At its current distance, HD 90362's brightness is diminished by an interstellar extinction of 0.19 magnitudes and it has an absolute magnitude of +0.19.

HD 90362 is an old population II star with a stellar classification of K6 III Fe −0.5, indicating that it is an evolved K-type giant that has exhausted hydrogen at its core and left the main sequence along with a mild spectral underabundance of iron. It is currently on the asymptotic giant branch, generating energy via the fusion of hydrogen and helium shells around an inert carbon core. It has only 44% the mass of the Sun but at the age of 11 billion years, it has expanded to 41.1 times the radius of the Sun. It radiates 252 times the luminosity of the Sun from its enlarged photosphere at an effective temperature of 3,804 K. HD 90362 is metal deficient with an iron abundance of [Fe/H] = −0.1 or 79.4% of the Sun's and it spins slowly with a projected rotational velocity of approximately 1.5 km/s.

The variability of the star was first detected in 1997 by the Hipparcos mission. It found variations between 5.69 and 5.72 in the Hipparcos passband. As of 2004, its variability has not been confirmed. HD 90362 has an optical companion located 142.6" away along a position angle of 100° as of 2010. It was first observed by M. Scaria in 1981.
