= BD−08°2823 b =

Extrasolar planet in the constellation Sextans

Discovery
- Discovered by: Hebrard et al.
- Discovery site: La Silla Observatory
- Discovery date: October 19, 2009
- Detection method: Radial velocity (HARPS)

Orbital characteristics
- Semi-major axis: 0.056 AU (8.4 million km)
- Eccentricity: 0.15
- Orbital period (sidereal): 5.60 d
- Time of periastron: 2,454,637.7 ± 1.6
- Argument of periastron: 30 ± 100
- Semi-amplitude: 6.5 ± 1.0
- Star: BD−08°2823

BD−08°2823 b (also known as HIP 49067 b) is an extrasolar planet which orbits the K-type main-sequence star BD−08°2823, located approximately 135 light-years away in the constellation Sextans. This planet has at least 14 times the mass of Earth and takes four fifths of a week to orbit the star at a semi-major axis of 0.056 AU. This planet is classified as a hot Neptune. This planet was detected by High Accuracy Radial Velocity Planet Searcher (HARPS) on October 19, 2009, together with 29 other planets, including BD−08°2823 c.
