= BD−08°2823 =

K-type main sequence star in the constellation Sextans

Observation data Epoch J2000.0 Equinox ICRS
- Constellation: Sextans
- Right ascension: 10^{h} 00^{m} 47.7206^{s}
- Declination: –09° 31′ 00.0428″
- Apparent magnitude (V): 9.86

Characteristics
- Spectral type: K4:V
- Apparent magnitude (B): 10.931
- Apparent magnitude (J): 7.960±0.020
- Apparent magnitude (H): 7.498±0.047
- Apparent magnitude (K): 7.323±0.021
- B−V color index: 1.071±0.010

Astrometry
Radial velocity (R_{v})	53.47±0.19 km/s
Proper motion (μ)	RA: −375.517±0.066 mas/yr Dec.: 25.460±0.060 mas/yr
Parallax (π)	24.1641±0.0397 mas
Distance	135.0 ± 0.2 ly (41.38 ± 0.07 pc)
Absolute magnitude (M_{V})	6.73

Details
Mass	0.741±0.020 M_{☉}
Radius	0.71±0.04 R_{☉}
Luminosity	0.237±0.001 L_{☉}
Surface gravity (log g)	4.33±0.26 cgs
Temperature	4,746±63 K
Metallicity [Fe/H]	−0.04±0.06 dex
Rotation	26.6±1.5 days
Rotational velocity (v sin i)	1.4 km/s
Age	5.0±4.7 Gyr

Other designations
- BD−08°2823, HIP 49067, SAO 137286, PPM 192987, LTT 3669, NLTT 23181, Ross 444, Gaia DR2 3770419611540574080

Database references
SIMBAD	data
Exoplanet Archive	data

BD−08°2823 is a star with a pair of exoplanetary companions in the faint equatorial constellation of Sextans. The star has an apparent visual magnitude of 9.86, which is too faint to be visible with the naked eye. This system is located at a distance of 135 light-years from the Sun based on parallax measurements, and is trending further away with a radial velocity of +53 km/s. It is a high proper motion star that is traversing the celestial sphere at the angular rate of 0.369″ yr^{−1}.

This is an ordinary K-type main-sequence star with a stellar classification of K4:V, where the ':' notation indicates some uncertainty. Emission cores in the H and K lines suggest this is an active star, with the level of activity varying significantly over time. It is roughly five billion years old and is spinning with a projected rotational velocity of 1.4 km/s. Measurements of the activity variation suggest a rotation period of around 27 days. This star is smaller, cooler, and less massive than the Sun. Its metal content is slightly lower than in the Sun. The star is radiating 24% of the luminosity of the Sun from its photosphere at an effective temperature of 4,746 K.

== Planetary system ==
In 2009, two planets were found in orbit around the star. They were discovered using the radial velocity method with the HARPS spectrograph in Chile, despite the data noise introduced through surface activity. The inner planet has a minimum mass equal to 14.4±2.1 times the mass of the Earth, while the outer planet is at least one third the mass of Jupiter.

The BD−08°2823 planetary system
Companion (in order from star)	Mass	Semimajor axis (AU)	Orbital period (days)	Eccentricity	Inclination (°)	Radius
b	≥0.045 ± 0.007 M_{J}	0.056 ± 0.002	5.60 ± 0.02	0.15 ± 0.15	—	—
c	≥0.33 ± 0.03 M_{J}	0.68 ± 0.02	237.6 ± 1.5	0.19 ± 0.09	—	—

== See also ==
- Lists of exoplanets
