= BD−08°2823 c =

Extrasolar planet in the constellation Sextans

Discovery
- Discovered by: Hebrard et al.
- Discovery site: La Silla Observatory
- Discovery date: October 19, 2009
- Detection method: Radial velocity (HARPS)

Orbital characteristics
- Semi-major axis: 0.68 AU (102,000,000 km)
- Eccentricity: 0.19
- Orbital period (sidereal): 237.6 d
- Time of periastron: 2454193 ± 13
- Argument of periastron: -233 ± 21
- Semi-amplitude: 13.4 ± 1.0
- Star: BD−08°2823

BD−08°2823 c (also known as HIP 49067 c) is an extrasolar planet which orbits the K-type main sequence star BD−08°2823, located approximately 135 light years away in the constellation Sextans. This planet has at least one-thirds the mass of Jupiter and takes 7.8 months to orbit the star at a semimajor axis of 0.68 AU. This planet was detected by HARPS on October 19, 2009, together with 29 other planets, including BD−08°2823 b.
