= HD 92788 =

Star in the constellation Sextans

Observation data Epoch J2000 Equinox ICRS
- Constellation: Sextans
- Right ascension: 10^{h} 42^{m} 48.52807^{s}
- Declination: −02° 11′ 01.5221″
- Apparent magnitude (V): 7.31

Characteristics
- Spectral type: G6V
- B−V color index: 0.694±0.005

Astrometry
Radial velocity (R_{v})	−4.455±0.0518 km/s
Proper motion (μ)	RA: −15.128±0.080 mas/yr Dec.: −223.230±0.061 mas/yr
Parallax (π)	28.8281±0.0493 mas
Distance	113.1 ± 0.2 ly (34.69 ± 0.06 pc)
Absolute magnitude (M_{V})	4.56

Details
Mass	1.032 M_{☉}
Radius	1.14±0.01 R_{☉}
Luminosity	1.253±0.003 L_{☉}
Surface gravity (log g)	4.39 cgs
Temperature	5,722+11 −22 K
Metallicity [Fe/H]	0.22±0.05 dex
Rotation	31.7 days
Age	7.6±2.4 Gyr

Other designations
- BD−01°2431, HD 92788, HIP 52409, SAO 137743, LTT 3928, 2MASS J10424853-0211011

Database references
SIMBAD	data
Exoplanet Archive	data

HD 92788 is a star in the equatorial constellation of Sextans. It has a yellow hue but is too dim to be visible to the naked eye, having an apparent visual magnitude of 7.31. The star is located at a distance of 113 light years from the Sun based on parallax, but is drifting closer with a radial velocity of −4.5 km/s. Two planets have been found in orbit around the star.

This is a G-type main-sequence star with a stellar classification of G6V. It is estimated to be around eight billion years old and is spinning with a rotation period of 31.7 days. The star has a similar mass to the Sun and is slightly larger in radius, with a high metallicity. It is radiating 1.25 times the luminosity of the Sun from its photosphere at an effective temperature of 5,722 K.

== Planetary system ==
An extrasolar planet was discovered orbiting this star in 2001 by means of the radial velocity method. Designated component 'b', it is a Super-Jupiter with an orbital period of 0.89 years. The star rotates at an inclination of 8^{+14}_{−8} degrees relative to Earth. It is probable that this planet shares that inclination, but direct measurements of the orbital inclinations via astrometry are inconsistent with the stellar rotational inclinaion.

A second planetary companion was announced in 2019. Designated 'c', it orbiting with a period of around 27 years and a semimajor axis of 9.4 AU.

The HD 92788 planetary system
Companion (in order from star)	Mass	Semimajor axis (AU)	Orbital period (days)	Eccentricity	Inclination (°)	Radius
b	4.1+1.9 −0.5 M_{J}	0.95±0.01	325.72±0.03	0.347±0.007	80±40	—
c	3.8+0.7 −0.6 M_{J}	8.4±0.3	9,857±926	0.35+0.06 −0.05	100+40 −50	—
