= LHS 292 =

Red dwarf star in the constellation Sextans

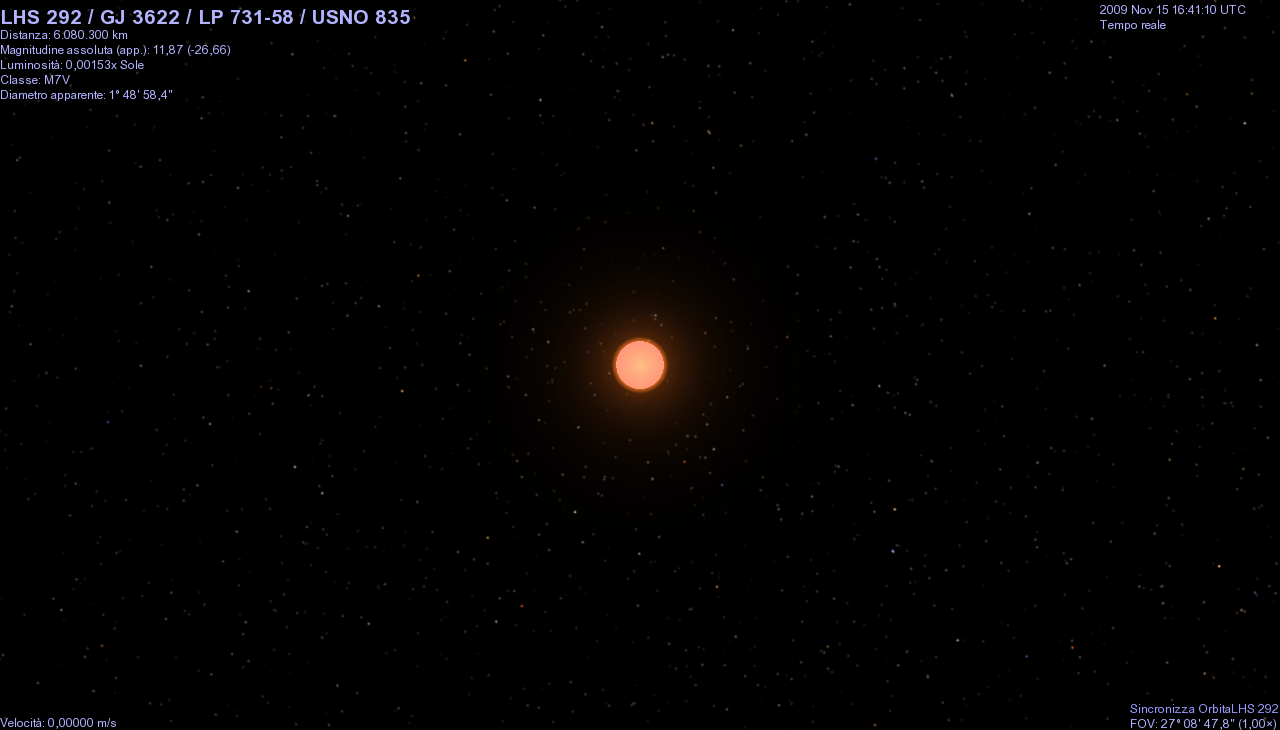
- Generic rendering of LHS 292 flare star

Observation data Epoch J2000 Equinox ICRS
- Constellation: Sextans
- Right ascension: 10^{h} 48^{m} 12.61425^{s}
- Declination: −11° 20′ 09.6107″
- Apparent magnitude (V): 15.73

Characteristics
- Spectral type: M6.5V
- Apparent magnitude (J): 8.9
- B−V color index: 2.10
- Variable type: Flare star

Astrometry
Radial velocity (R_{v})	1.47±0.67 km/s
Proper motion (μ)	RA: 579.019(66) mas/yr Dec.: −1530.076(58) mas/yr
Parallax (π)	219.3302±0.0602 mas
Distance	14.871 ± 0.004 ly (4.559 ± 0.001 pc)
Absolute magnitude (M_{V})	17.45

Details
Mass	0.099±0.009 M_{☉}
Radius	0.1164±0.0044 R_{☉}
Luminosity	(6.49±0.09)×10^{−4} L_{☉}
Surface gravity (log g)	5.33±0.16 cgs
Temperature	3,029±25 K
Metallicity [Fe/H]	−0.12±0.16 dex

Other designations
- LP 731-58, GJ 3622, GCTP 2516.02

Database references
SIMBAD	data
- Location of LHS 292 in the constellation Sextans

LHS 292 is a red dwarf star in the constellation Sextans. It is far too faint to be seen with the unaided eye and requires a large amateur telescope to be seen visually. It lies at a distance of 14.871 light-years (4.559 parsecs), making it one of the nearest stars. It is a flare star, which means it can suddenly increase in brightness for short periods of time.

It has the space velocity components [U, V, W] = [28, −16, −14] km/s.
