= 41 Sextantis =

Spectroscopic binary with an Am star

- Location of 41 Sex on the map (circled)

Observation data Epoch J2000.0 Equinox J2000.0 (ICRS)
- Constellation: Sextans
- Right ascension: 10^{h} 50^{m} 18.05639^{s}
- Declination: −08° 53′ 51.9538″
- Apparent magnitude (V): 5.79±0.01

Characteristics

Aa
- Spectral type: kA3 hA7V mA9
- U−B color index: +0.13
- B−V color index: +0.16

Ab
- Spectral type: F/G

Astrometry
Radial velocity (R_{v})	−4.9±2.9 km/s
Proper motion (μ)	RA: −5.694 mas/yr Dec.: −15.814 mas/yr
Parallax (π)	10.5160±0.0428 mas
Distance	310 ± 1 ly (95.1 ± 0.4 pc)
Absolute magnitude (M_{V})	+0.91

Orbit
Primary	Aa
Period (P)	6.1670 d
Eccentricity (e)	0.014±0.006
Periastron epoch (T)	2,453,690.7442±0.0011 JD
Argument of periastron (ω) (secondary)	272±4°
Semi-amplitude (K_{1}) (primary)	46.67±0.04 km/s
Semi-amplitude (K_{2}) (secondary)	93.06±0.20 km/s

Details

Aa
Mass	2.23 M_{☉}
Radius	3.10±0.16 R_{☉}
Luminosity	32.6±1.7 L_{☉}
Surface gravity (log g)	3.83^{+0.10}_{−0.07} cgs
Temperature	7,759 K
Metallicity [Fe/H]	−0.23 dex
Rotational velocity (v sin i)	24 km/s
Age	698^{+128}_{−108} Myr

Ab
Mass	1.05 M_{☉}
Radius	1.3±0.2 R_{☉}
Luminosity	1.8±0.5 L_{☉}
Rotational velocity (v sin i)	10 km/s

Other designations
- 41 Sex, 74 G. Sextantis, BD−08°3018, FK5 1281, GC 14906, HD 93903, HIP 52980, HR 4237, SAO 137823, CCDM J10503-0853A, WDS J10503-0854A

Database references
SIMBAD	data

41 Sextantis (HD 93903; HR 4237; 74 G. Sextantis), or simply 41 Sex is a spectroscopic binary located in the equatorial constellation Sextans. It has an apparent magnitude of 5.79, making it faintly visible to the naked eye under ideal conditions. The system is located relatively close at a distance of 310 light-years based on Gaia DR3 parallax measurements and it is drifting closer with a heliocentric radial velocity of approximately −4.9 km/s. At its current distance, 41 Sex's brightness is diminished by an interstellar extinction of 0.16 magnitudes and it has an absolute magnitude of +0.91.

The visible component has a stellar classification of kA3hA7VmA9, indicating that it is an Am star with the calcium K-lines of an A3 star, the hydrogen lines and effective temperature of an A7 main-sequence star, and the metal lines of an A9 star. Houk & Swift (1999) give a class of A2/3 III, indicating that it is an A-type star that has the characteristics of an A2 and A3 giant star. It has 2.23 times the mass of the Sun and a slightly enlarged radius 3.10 times that of the Sun. It radiates 32.6 times the luminosity of the Sun from its photosphere at an effective temperature of 7,759 K, giving it a white-hue when viewed in the night sky. 41 Sextantis Aa is metal-deficient with an iron abundance 58.9% that of the Sun and it spins modestly with a projected rotational velocity of 24 km/s.

The companion's spectrum is very weak compared to the primary, but it is said to be either a late F-type star or an early G-type star. It has 105% the mass of the Sun and 1.3 times the radius of the Sun. It radiates 1.8 times the luminosity of the Sun from its photosphere. It spins slowly with a projected rotational velocity of 10 km/s.
