= HD 93833 =

Star in the constellation Sextans

- Location of HD 93833 on the map (circled)

Observation data Epoch J2000.0 Equinox ICRS
- Constellation: Sextans
- Right ascension: 10^{h} 49^{m} 43.49171^{s}
- Declination: −09° 51′ 09.6859″
- Apparent magnitude (V): 5.84±0.01

Characteristics
- Evolutionary stage: red clump
- Spectral type: K0 III
- U−B color index: +0.91
- B−V color index: +1.07

Astrometry
Radial velocity (R_{v})	40.3±2.9 km/s
Proper motion (μ)	RA: +5.882 mas/yr Dec.: −30.041 mas/yr
Parallax (π)	9.4637±0.1343 mas
Distance	345 ± 5 ly (106 ± 1 pc)
Absolute magnitude (M_{V})	+0.76

Details
Mass	1.40 M_{☉}
Radius	10.7±0.5 R_{☉}
Luminosity	60.4±1.0 L_{☉}
Surface gravity (log g)	2.46 cgs
Temperature	4,675±22 K
Metallicity [Fe/H]	−0.11±0.09 dex
Age	5.50 Gyr

Other designations
- 73 G. Sextantis, BD−09°3147, GC 14900, HD 93833, HIP 52948, HR 4233, SAO 137815, TIC 55109651

Database references
SIMBAD	data

HD 93833 (HR 4233; 73 G. Sextantis) is a solitary star located in the equatorial constellation Sextans. It is faintly visible to the naked eye as an orange-hued point of light with an apparent magnitude of 5.84. Gaia DR2 parallax measurements imply a distance of 345 light-years and it receding with a heliocentric radial velocity of 40.3 km/s. At its current distance, HD 93833's brightness is diminished by an interstellar extinction of 0.18 magnitudes and it has an absolute magnitude of +0.76.

HD 93833 has a stellar classification of K0 III, indicating that it is an evolved K-type giant star that has exhausted hydrogen at its core and left the main sequence. It is currently a red clump star that is on the horizontal branch—fusing helium at its core. It has 1.4 times the mass of the Sun but at the age of 5.5 billion years, it has expanded to 10.7 times the radius of the Sun. It radiates 60.4 times the luminosity of the Sun from its photosphere at an effective temperature of 4,675 K. HD 93833 is slightly metal deficient with an iron abundance of [Fe/H] = −0.11 or 77.6% of the Sun's abundance.
