= Epsilon Sextantis =

Star in the constellation Sextans

ε Sextantis
- Location of ε Sextantis (circled in red)

Observation data Epoch J2000.0 Equinox J2000.0 (ICRS)
- Constellation: Sextans
- Right ascension: 10^{h} 17^{m} 37.80200^{s}
- Declination: −08° 04′ 08.0898″
- Apparent magnitude (V): 5.24

Characteristics
- Spectral type: F0 IV
- U−B color index: +0.09
- B−V color index: +0.32

Astrometry
Radial velocity (R_{v})	+15.2 km/s
Proper motion (μ)	RA: −160.57 mas/yr Dec.: +2.91 mas/yr
Parallax (π)	16.86±0.28 mas
Distance	193 ± 3 ly (59.3 ± 1.0 pc)
Absolute magnitude (M_{V})	2.42

Details
Mass	1.94 M_{☉}
Radius	3.14+0.18 −0.30 R_{☉}
Luminosity	23.24±0.55 L_{☉}
Surface gravity (log g)	3.83±0.08 cgs
Temperature	7,166±88 K
Metallicity [Fe/H]	+0.31±0.05 dex
Rotational velocity (v sin i)	63.5±3.2 km/s
Age	1.1 Gyr

Other designations
- ε Sex, 22 Sextantis, BD−07°3001, FK5 1263, HD 89254, HIP 50414, HR 4042, SAO 137469

Database references
SIMBAD	data

Epsilon Sextantis, Latinized from ε Sextantis, is a solitary, yellow-white hued star in the equatorial constellation of Sextans. With an apparent visual magnitude of 5.24, it is faintly visible to the naked eye on a dark night. The distance to this star, based upon an annual parallax shift of 16.86 mas, is about 193 light years. It is drifting further away from the Sun with a radial velocity of +15 km/s.

This is an F-type subgiant star with a stellar classification of F0 IV. However, Malaroda (1975) gave a classification of F2 III, which would indicate a more evolved giant star. It is estimated to have nearly double the mass of the Sun with 3.1 times the Sun's radius. The star is around 1.1 billion years old and has a projected rotational velocity of 63.5 km/s. It is radiating 23 times the luminosity of the Sun from its photosphere at an effective temperature of 7,166 K.
