= 7 Sextantis =

Star in the constellation Sextans

- Location of 7 Sex on the map (circled in red)

Observation data Epoch J2000.0 Equinox J2000.0 (ICRS)
- Constellation: Sextans
- Right ascension: 09^{h} 52^{m} 12.16^{s}
- Declination: +02° 27′ 14.9″
- Apparent magnitude (V): 6.02

Characteristics
- Evolutionary stage: main sequence
- Spectral type: A0III/IV
- U−B color index: −0.09
- B−V color index: −0.04

Astrometry
Radial velocity (R_{v})	+103.29±0.18 km/s
Proper motion (μ)	RA: −183.327 mas/yr Dec.: +94.912 mas/yr
Parallax (π)	4.9887±0.0424 mas
Distance	654 ± 6 ly (200 ± 2 pc)
Absolute magnitude (M_{V})	−0.49

Details
Mass	2.58 M_{☉}
Radius	4.47 R_{☉}
Luminosity	185 L_{☉}
Surface gravity (log g)	3.55 cgs
Temperature	10,071 K
Rotational velocity (v sin i)	22 km/s

Other designations
- 7 Sex, HD 85504, HIP 48414, HR 3906, SAO 117959

Database references
SIMBAD	data

7 Sextantis is an early A-type star in the constellation Sextans. The star has a relatively large proper motion and high radial velocity and is catalogued as a high proper motion star in astronomical databases. Because of its unusual kinematics, it has been interpreted either as a possible runaway star ejected from the Scorpius-Centaurus association or as an evolved object belonging to the old Galactic disk.

== Early spectrophotometric studies ==
An early spectrophotometric comparison between 7 Sextantis and Sirius was reported by Yvonne H. Stone and George Wallerstein in 1961. Their analysis indicated that titanium and chromium appeared to have normal abundances, while magnesium, silicon and manganese might be enhanced by factors of two to three relative to Sirius.

The same study suggested that strontium could be deficient by roughly a factor of two and barium by at least a factor of three. The helium lines He I λ4026, λ4388 and λ4471 appeared stronger than expected, possibly indicating an excess of helium, although the authors emphasised that this conclusion was highly sensitive to the assumed temperature.

A full spectroscopic analysis was subsequently published by George Wallerstein, Yvonne H. Stone, and John A. Williams in 1962. Using curve of growth techniques and spectra obtained with the 100-inch coudé spectrograph at Mount Wilson Observatory, they compared 7 Sextantis directly with Sirius. Their analysis found the ratio of metals to hydrogen to be similar in both stars, while the helium-to-hydrogen ratio in 7 Sextantis was found to be at least ten times higher than in Sirius. A strong spectral feature near λ4267 was tentatively identified as C II, which, if correct, would imply a carbon abundance about twenty times higher than in Sirius. Most other elements, including oxygen, sodium, aluminium, silicon, calcium, titanium, vanadium, and iron, were found to be normal relative to Sirius, while strontium appeared deficient by about 0.30 dex and barium was detected only as an upper limit, suggesting a significant deficiency.

The authors considered two possible interpretations of the abundance anomalies. One possibility was that 7 Sextantis is a rapid rotator seen pole-on, producing a composite spectrum that mimics abundance anomalies. The other was that the anomalies are real and that the star had evolved from a metal-poor main sequence star onto the horizontal branch, with mass loss and mixing having brought helium and carbon produced in the interior to the surface.

== Atmospheric parameters and chemical composition ==
Modern spectroscopic and photometric studies have provided refined atmospheric parameters for 7 Sextantis. Early analyses by Rodgers and Wood derived θ_{eff} = 0.49±0.01 and log g = 3.45±0.15, with abundances broadly consistent with solar values. Early comparisons of hydrogen line profiles also indicated similarities with Sirius.

A later abundance study by Saul Adelman and A. G. Davis Philip determined an effective temperature of 10,135 K and a surface gravity of log g = 3.69 using photometric calibrations. They reported a helium abundance of He/H = 0.10±0.01 and found most elements to have abundances close to solar values. The mean abundance ratio was estimated as [A/H] = 0.20±0.22, suggesting slight metal enrichment, with carbon and chromium enhanced by about +0.5 dex.

Projected rotational velocity has been measured at about 22 km/s in modern analyses, compared to earlier estimates of roughly 15 km/s. Their results indicate that the star's atmospheric properties are broadly consistent with those of main-sequence A-type stars.

== Kinematics and origin ==
The large proper motion and high radial velocity of 7 Sextantis have led to different interpretations of its origin. Wallerstein et al. measured a total space velocity of about 161 km/s relative to the local standard of rest, with 34 km/s directed toward the north galactic pole. Martinet suggested that the star may be a runaway star ejected from the Upper Centaurus-Lupus subgroup of the Scorpius-Centaurus association. By tracing its motion backward in time, he estimated that such an ejection would have occurred about 1.1-1.5 million years ago.

Rodgers and Wood later proposed an alternative explanation, arguing that the star's Galactic orbit was inconsistent with an evolved runaway B-star scenario. Instead they interpreted the star as an old-disk horizontal-branch star with a mass of about 3.5 M_{☉} and an estimated age of approximately 170 million years. Their orbital calculations indicated that the star moves on an eccentric orbit characteristic of old-disk objects.
