= 18 Sextantis =

K-type giant star in the constellation Sextans

- Location of 18 Sex on the map (circled)

Observation data Epoch J2000.0 Equinox J2000.0 (ICRS)
- Constellation: Sextans
- Right ascension: 10^{h} 10^{m} 55.86074^{s}
- Declination: −08° 25′ 06.4527″
- Apparent magnitude (V): 5.62±0.01

Characteristics
- Spectral type: K2/3 III
- U−B color index: +1.42
- B−V color index: +1.30

Astrometry
Radial velocity (R_{v})	0.2±2.9 km/s
Proper motion (μ)	RA: −0.115 mas/yr Dec.: −43.987 mas/yr
Parallax (π)	5.8416±0.0881 mas
Distance	558 ± 8 ly (171 ± 3 pc)
Absolute magnitude (M_{V})	−0.16

Details
Radius	27.3±1.4 R_{☉}
Luminosity	222±12 L_{☉}
Surface gravity (log g)	1.72 cgs
Temperature	4,410±122 K
Metallicity [Fe/H]	−0.31^{+0.01}_{−0.00} dex
Rotational velocity (v sin i)	<1.0 km/s

Other designations
- 18 Sex, 32 G. Sextantis, BD−07°2977, GC 13990, HD 88333, HIP 49865, HR 3996, SAO 137395, TIC 26206896

Database references
SIMBAD	data

18 Sextantis (HD 88333; HR 3996; 32 G. Sextantis), or simply 18 Sex, is a solitary star located in the southern constellation Sextans. It is faintly visible to the naked eye as an orange-hued point of light with an apparent magnitude of 5.62. Gaia DR3 parallax measurements imply a distance of 558 light-years and it is slowly receding with a poorly constrained heliocentric radial velocity of approximately 0.2 km/s. At its current distance, 18 Sex's brightness is diminished with an interstellar extinction of two-tenths of a magnitude and it has an absolute magnitude of −0.16.

18 Sex has a stellar classification of K2/3 III, indicating that it is an evolved star with the characteristics of a K2 and K3 giant star. At present, it has exhausted hydrogen at its core and it has expanded to 27.3 times the radius of the Sun. It radiates 222 times the luminosity of the Sun from its enlarged photosphere at an effective temperature of 4,410 K. Gaia DR3 models it to be a larger and brighter red giant branch star with a radius of 35.27 R_{☉} and a luminosity of 384 L_{☉}. 18 Sex is metal deficient with an iron abundance of [Fe/H] = −0.31 or 49% of the Sun's and it spins too slowly for its projected rotational velocity to be measured accurately, having a velocity lower than 1.0 km/s.

== See also ==
- 17 Sextantis, an A-type main-sequence star located 12' away.
