= Delta Sextantis =

Solitary star in the constellation Sextans

δ Sextantis
- Location of δ Sextantis (circled in red)

Observation data Epoch J2000.0 Equinox J2000.0 (ICRS)
- Constellation: Sextans
- Right ascension: 10^{h} 29^{m} 28.70222^{s}
- Declination: −02° 44′ 20.6862″
- Apparent magnitude (V): +5.25

Characteristics
- Spectral type: B9.5 V
- U−B color index: −0.12
- B−V color index: −0.04

Astrometry
Radial velocity (R_{v})	18.07±0.96 km/s
Proper motion (μ)	RA: −48.86 mas/yr Dec.: −13.43 mas/yr
Parallax (π)	10.13±0.23 mas
Distance	322 ± 7 ly (99 ± 2 pc)
Absolute magnitude (M_{V})	+0.22

Details
Mass	2.6±0.3 M_{☉}
Radius	3.25±0.12 R_{☉}
Luminosity	100±7 L_{☉}
Surface gravity (log g)	3.83±0.07 cgs
Temperature	10,139±131 K
Metallicity [Fe/H]	−0.51 dex
Rotational velocity (v sin i)	152 km/s
Age	146 Myr

Other designations
- δ Sex, 29 Sextantis, BD−02°3155, FK5 1270, HD 90882, HIP 51362, HR 4116, SAO 137600

Database references
SIMBAD	data

Delta Sextantis (δ Sex, δ Sextantis) is a solitary star in the equatorial constellation of Sextans. With an annual parallax shift of 10.13 mas, it lies at a distance of around 322 light years from the Sun. This star is faintly visible to the naked eye, having an apparent visual magnitude of +5.25. According to the Bortle scale, that means it can be viewed from dark suburban skies.

This is a B-type main sequence star with a stellar classification of B9.5 V; just shy of being a cooler A-type star. It is estimated to have 2.6 times the Sun's mass and 3.25 times the radius of the Sun. It is 146 million years old, with a projected rotational velocity of 152 km/s. The star radiates 100 times the solar luminosity from its outer atmosphere at an effective temperature of 10,139 K.
