= 19 Sextantis =

K-type giant star; Sextans

- Location of 19 Sex on the map (circled)

Observation data Epoch J2000.0 Equinox ICRS
- Constellation: Sextans
- Right ascension: 10^{h} 12^{m} 48.36462^{s}
- Declination: +04° 36′ 52.8378″
- Apparent magnitude (V): 5.78±0.01

Characteristics
- Evolutionary stage: red giant branch
- Spectral type: K1 III or K0 III
- U−B color index: +1.11
- B−V color index: +1.18

Astrometry
Radial velocity (R_{v})	31.80±0.21 km/s
Proper motion (μ)	RA: −50.538 mas/yr Dec.: −6.118 mas/yr
Parallax (π)	6.3184±0.0625 mas
Distance	516 ± 5 ly (158 ± 2 pc)

Details
Mass	0.88^{+0.08}_{−0.03} M_{☉}
Radius	23.13±1.17 R_{☉}
Luminosity	241^{+4}_{−5} L_{☉}
Temperature	4,576±123 K
Metallicity [Fe/H]	−0.53 dex
Rotational velocity (v sin i)	2.5±0.8 km/s
Age	7.94^{+1.83}_{−0.70} Gyr

Other designations
- 19 Sex, 34 G. Sextantis, AG+04°1386, BD+05°2301, GC 14022, HD 88547, HIP 50027, HR 4004, SAO 118164, TIC 277696329

Database references
SIMBAD	data

19 Sextantis (HD 88547; HR 4004; 34 G. Sextantis), or simply 19 Sex, is a solitary star located in the equatorial constellation Sextans. It is faintly visible to the naked eye as an orange-hued point of light with an apparent magnitude of 5.78. Gaia DR3 parallax measurements imply a distance of 516 light-years and it is currently receding with a heliocentric radial velocity of 31.8 km/s. At its current distance, 19 Sex's brightness is diminished by an interstellar extinction of 0.17 magnitudes.

19 Sex has a stellar classification of K1 III, indicating that it is an evolved K-type giant star that has ceased hydrogen fusion at it core and it has left the main sequence. It has also been given a slightly hotter class of K0 III. Stellar evolution models from Stock et al. (2018) model it to be a red giant branch star (100% chance) that is currently fusing a hydrogen shell around an inert helium core. It has 88% the mass of the Sun but at the age of 7.94 billion years, it has expanded to 23.13 times the radius of the Sun. It radiates 241 times the luminosity of the Sun from its photosphere at an effective temperature of 4,576 K. 19 Sex is metal deficient with an iron abundance of [Fe/H] = −0.53 or 29.5% of the Sun's and it spins modestly with a projected rotational velocity of 2.5 km/s.
