= 25 Sextantis =

Alpha2 Canum Venactiorum variable

- Location of 25 Sex on the map (circled)

Observation data Epoch J2000.0 Equinox ICRS
- Constellation: Sextans
- Right ascension: 10^{h} 23^{m} 26.47823^{s}
- Declination: −04° 04′ 26.5182″
- Apparent magnitude (V): 5.97 (5.94 - 5.98)

Characteristics
- Evolutionary stage: main sequence star
- Spectral type: B9p Si(CrSr)
- U−B color index: −0.17
- B−V color index: −0.10
- Variable type: α^{2} CVn

Astrometry
Radial velocity (R_{v})	23.0±3.4 km/s
Proper motion (μ)	RA: −50.818 mas/yr Dec.: +4.114 mas/yr
Parallax (π)	9.4414±0.0598 mas
Distance	345 ± 2 ly (105.9 ± 0.7 pc)
Absolute magnitude (M_{V})	+0.86

Details
Mass	2.48±0.07 M_{☉}
Radius	2.22±0.11 R_{☉}
Luminosity	45.7^{+13.2}_{−10.2} L_{☉}
Surface gravity (log g)	4.14 cgs
Temperature	11,500 K
Metallicity [Fe/H]	−0.19 dex
Rotational velocity (v sin i)	24±3 km/s
Age	309^{+54}_{−80} Myr

Other designations
- 25 Sex, 43 G. Sextantis, SS Sextantis, BD−03°2911, FK5 388, GC 14268, HD 90044, HIP 50885, HR 4082, SAO 137533, TIC 1712781

Database references
SIMBAD	data

25 Sextantis (HD 90044; HR 4082; 43 G. Sextantis), or simply 25 Sex, is a star located in the equatorial constellation Sextans; it also bears the variable star designation SS Sextantis (SS Sex). With an average apparent magnitude of 5.97, 25 Sex is barely visible to the naked eye, even under ideal conditions. Gaia DR3 parallax measurements imply a distance of 345 light-years, and it is currently drifting away with a heliocentric radial velocity of approximately 23 km/s. At its current distance, 25 Sex's average brightness is diminished by an interstellar extinction of 0.17 magnitudes and it has an absolute magnitude of +0.86.

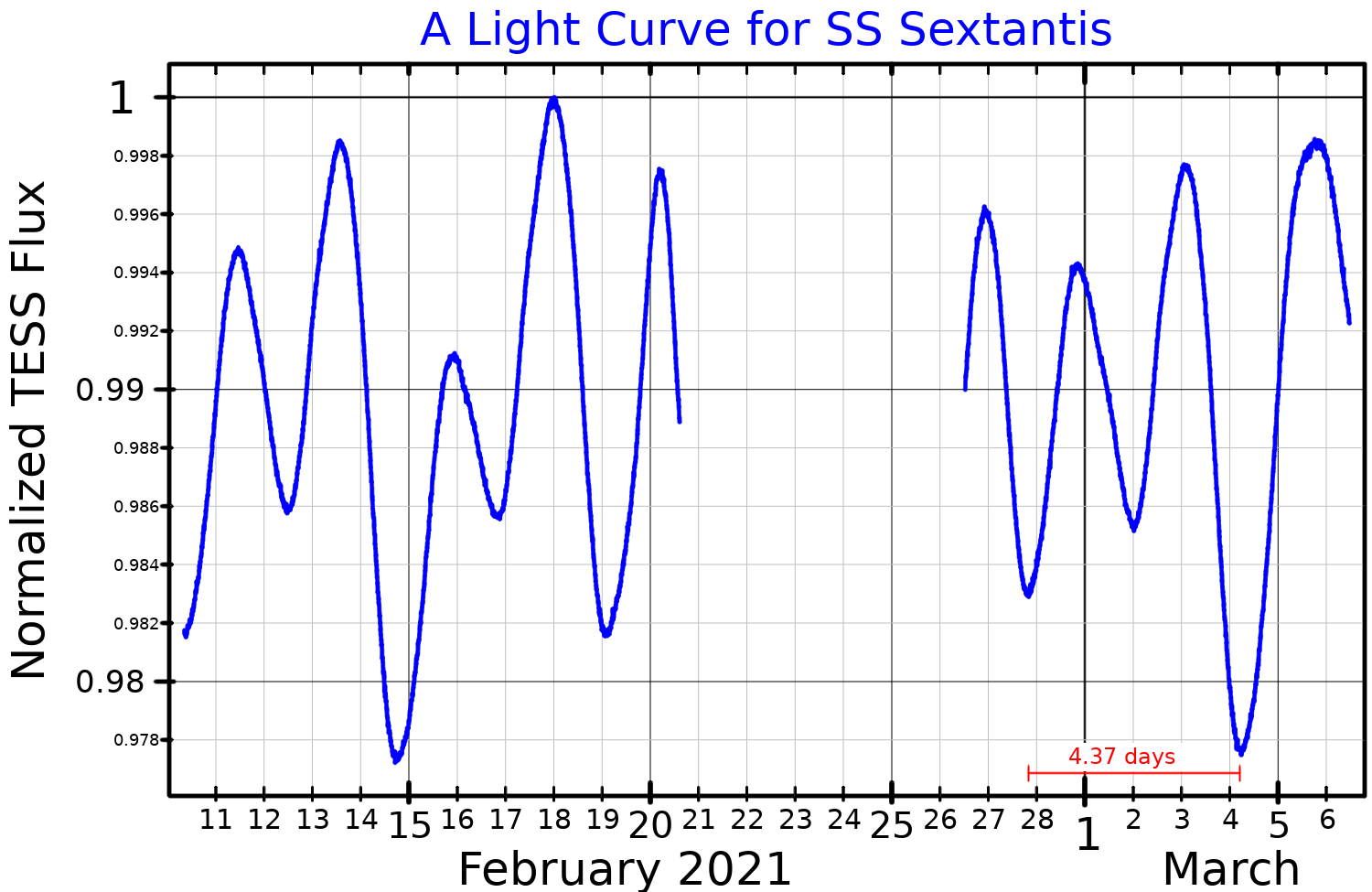
A light curve for SS Sextantis, plotted from TESS data. The 4.37 day rotation period is shown in red.

The star was first discovered to be variable in 1980 by French astronomers P. Renson & J. Manfroid. They observed a 4.37 day period for 25 Sex and a flucation of 0.03 magnitudes in optical light. The next year, it was confirmed to be variable and it was given the variable star designation SS Sextantis. J. Manfroid and G. Mathys refined the period of 25 Sextantis to be slightly longer than previously measured; the period of SS Sextantis was measured at 4.39 days but with a larger uncertainty. In 1993, D. A. Bohlender and colleagues measured the magnetic field of the star and found that it varied between 650 and 1,200 gauss, although with some uncertainty about the variation. Subsequent observations provide a much wider range between 1 and -1,000 gauss.

25 Sex has a stellar classification of B9pSi(CrSr), indicating that it is a Bp star with abundance of silicon, chromium, and strontium in its spectrum. It has 2.48 times the mass of the Sun and 2.22 times the radius of the Sun. It radiates 45.7 times the luminosity of the Sun from its photosphere at an effective temperature of roughly 11,500 K, giving it a bluish-white hue when viewed in the night sky. 25 Sex is metal deficient with an iron abundance 64.6% of the Sun's and it is estimated to be 309 million years old. At that age, it has completed 56% of its main sequence lifetime. Like many chemically peculiar stars it spins modestly—having a projected rotational velocity of 24 km/s.
