= Gamma Sextantis =

Star in the constellation Sextans

γ Sextantis
- Location of γ Sextantis (circled in red)

Observation data Epoch J2000.0 Equinox J2000.0 (ICRS)
- Constellation: Sextans
- Right ascension: 09^{h} 52^{m} 30.43727^{s}
- Declination: −08° 06′ 18.1269″
- Apparent magnitude (V): 5.05 (5.6 + 6.0)

Characteristics
- Evolutionary stage: main sequence
- Spectral type: A0/1 V (A1 V + A4 V)
- U−B color index: +0.06
- B−V color index: +0.04

Astrometry
Radial velocity (R_{v})	+12 km/s
Proper motion (μ)	RA: −57.28 mas/yr Dec.: −49.26 mas/yr
Parallax (π)	11.75±0.63 mas
Distance	280 ± 10 ly (85 ± 5 pc)
Absolute magnitude (M_{V})	+0.43

Orbit
Period (P)	77.61±0.59 yr
Semi-major axis (a)	0.380±0.013″
Eccentricity (e)	0.741±0.019
Inclination (i)	143.2±3.4°
Longitude of the node (Ω)	198.5±5.2°
Periastron epoch (T)	1956.84±0.69
Argument of periastron (ω) (secondary)	306.2±6.5°

Details
Mass	2.60 M_{☉}
Radius	3.2 R_{☉}
Luminosity	69 L_{☉}
Surface gravity (log g)	4.18±0.14 cgs
Temperature	9,825±334 K
Rotational velocity (v sin i)	134.6±1.4 km/s
Age	401 Myr

Other designations
- γ Sex, 8 Sextantis, BD−07°2909, HD 85558, HIP 48437, HR 3909, SAO 137199.

Database references
SIMBAD	data

Gamma Sextantis, Latinized as γ Sextantis, is a binary star system in the equatorial constellation of Sextans. The combined apparent visual magnitude of the system is 5.05, which means it is faintly visible to the naked eye. The annual parallax shift is 11.75 mas, indicating a distance of around 280 light years.

The two components orbit each other with a period of 77.6 years and a high eccentricity of 0.741. The orbital plane is inclined by 143.2° to the line of sight from the Earth. With a visual magnitude of 5.6, the brighter component Gamma Sextantis A is an A-type main sequence star with a stellar classification of A1 V. The fainter companion Gamma Sextantis B has a classification of A4 V with a magnitude of 6.0. Their combined spectrum matches a classification of A0/1 V. Their angular separation 0.4 arcseconds, so observation with a telescope requires a diameter of at least 30 centimeters.

There is a magnitude 12.28 companion star Gamma Sextantis C at an angular separation of 36.9 arc seconds along a position angle of 333°, as of 2000. This separation has increased from 30.0 arc seconds in 1834. The proper motion of this star differs from the Gamma Sextantis AB system, having proper motions of −29 mas/yr and +5 mas/yr in right ascension and declination, respectively.
