= 35 Sextantis =

Triple star system in Sextans

- Location of 35 Sex on the map (circled)

Observation data Epoch J2000.0 Equinox ICRS
- Constellation: Sextans
- A
- Right ascension: 10^{h} 43^{m} 20.92086^{s}
- Declination: +04° 44′ 51.6121″
- Apparent magnitude (V): 6.09±0.01
- B
- Right ascension: 10^{h} 43^{m} 20.52732^{s}
- Declination: +04° 44′ 48.2184″
- Apparent magnitude (V): 7.01±0.01

Characteristics
- U−B color index: +1.09
- B−V color index: +1.17

A
- Spectral type: K2.5 III

B
- Spectral type: K1 II-III

Astrometry

A
Radial velocity (R_{v})	−3.15±0.16 km/s
Proper motion (μ)	RA: +22.430 mas/yr Dec.: −33.285 mas/yr
Parallax (π)	4.6773±0.1457 mas
Distance	700 ± 20 ly (214 ± 7 pc)

B
Radial velocity (R_{v})	−1.49±0.98 km/s
Proper motion (μ)	RA: +24.384 mas/yr Dec.: −37.384 mas/yr
Parallax (π)	4.5442±0.15 mas
Distance	720 ± 20 ly (220 ± 7 pc)

Orbit
Primary	A
Secondary	B
Period (P)	23,302 yr
Semi-major axis (a)	6.80" (1,460 AU)

Orbit
Primary	Ba
Secondary	Bb
Period (P)	1,568.7±2.2 d
Semi-major axis (a)	0.021" (4.64 AU)
Eccentricity (e)	0.388±0.057
Periastron epoch (T)	2,451,911±27 JD
Argument of periastron (ω) (secondary)	311.8±3.3°
Semi-amplitude (K_{1}) (primary)	5.55±0.15 km/s

Details

A
Mass	2.45 M_{☉}
Radius	25.39^{+0.8}_{−2.2} R_{☉}
Luminosity	240±7 L_{☉}
Temperature	4,512±122 K
Metallicity [Fe/H]	−0.17 dex
Rotational velocity (v sin i)	3.7±0.3 km/s

Ba
Mass	2.44 M_{☉}
Radius	10.15^{+0.34}_{−0.30} R_{☉}
Luminosity	57.2±1.2 L_{☉}
Temperature	5,030±122 K
Metallicity [Fe/H]	−0.16 dex
Rotational velocity (v sin i)	4.1±0.5 km/s

Bb
Mass	0.58 M_{☉}

Other designations
- 10 H. Sextantis, 35 Sex, 68 G. Sextantis, AG+05°1556, BD+05°2384, GC 14745, HD 92841, HIP 52452, HR 4193, SAO 118449, CCDM J10433+0443, TIC 374350811

Database references
SIMBAD	The system
- A
- B

35 Sextantis (68 G. Sextantis; HD 92841; HR 4193), or simply 35 Sex, is a triple star system located in the equatorial constellation Sextans. The primary has an apparent magnitude of 6.09, making it barely visible to the naked eye, even under ideal conditions. The companion has an apparent magnitude of 7.01, making it readily visible in binoculars, but not to the naked eye. The system is located relatively far at a distance of approximately 700 light-years but it is drifting closer with a combined heliocentric radial velocity of −2.18 km/s.

== The System ==
A
Separation = 6.8″ Period = 23,000 y
Ba
Separation = 0.021″ Period = 1,580 d
Bb

Hierarchy of orbits in the 35 Sextantis system

The system was first observed by Friedrich Georg Wilhelm von Struve in 1821. The separation between the A and B component was initially 7.90 arcseconds, but it has since decreased to 6.62". Thanks to this separation, the components 35 Sextantis can be distinguished using a telescope. Observations from Tokovinin & Gorynya (2007) revealed that the B component is a single-lined spectroscopic binary. The primary and secondary both take 23,302 years to orbit each other while the secondary and its close companion take 1,568 days to revolve around each other in a relatively eccentric orbit.

== Physical characteristic ==
35 Sextantis A has a stellar classification of K2.5 III, indicating that it is an evolved K-type giant star that has exhausted hydrogen at its core and left the main sequence. 35 Sextantis B has a classification of K1 II-III, indicating that it is a hotter, more evolved K-type star that has the luminosity class intermediate between a bright giant and giant star. The primary has 2.45 times the mass of the Sun but it has expanded to 25.39 times the radius of the Sun. It radiates 240 times the luminosity of the Sun from its enlarged photosphere at an effective temperature of 4,512 K, giving it an orange-hued when viewed in the night sky.

The secondary has a similar mass to the primary but it is smaller, having a radius 10.15 times that of the Sun. 35 Sextantis B radiates 57.2 times the luminosity of the Sun from its photosphere at an effective temperature of 5030 K. Both stars are metal deficient with iron abundances of [Fe/H] = −0.17 and [Fe/H] = −0.16 respectively. They spin modestly with projected rotational velocities of 3.7 km/s and 4.1 km/s. The close companion has a mass 58% that of the Sun's, suggesting that it may be a K-type main-sequence star.
