= Alpha Sextantis =

Star in the constellation Sextans

α Sextantis
- Location of α Sextantis on the map (circled)

Observation data Epoch J2000 Equinox ICRS
- Constellation: Sextans
- Right ascension: 10^{h} 07^{m} 56.29556^{s}
- Declination: −00° 22′ 17.8621″
- Apparent magnitude (V): 4.49

Characteristics
- Spectral type: A0 III
- U−B color index: −0.07
- B−V color index: −0.04

Astrometry
Radial velocity (R_{v})	10.00 km/s
Proper motion (μ)	RA: −25.83 mas/yr Dec.: −4.25 mas/yr
Parallax (π)	11.51±0.98 mas
Distance	280 ± 20 ly (87 ± 7 pc)
Absolute magnitude (M_{V})	−0.29±0.21

Details
Mass	2.57±0.32 M_{☉}
Radius	3.07 R_{☉}
Luminosity	90 L_{☉}
Surface gravity (log g)	3.55 cgs
Temperature	9,984 K
Metallicity [Fe/H]	−0.03±0.18 dex
Rotational velocity (v sin i)	21 km/s
Age	385 Myr

Other designations
- α Sex, 15 Sextantis, BD+00°2615, FK5 2814, HD 87887, HIP 49641, HR 3981, SAO 137366.

Database references
SIMBAD	data

Alpha Sextantis (α Sex, α Sextantis) is the brightest star in the equatorial constellation of Sextans. It is visible to the naked eye on a dark night with an apparent visual magnitude of 4.49. The distance to this star, as determined from parallax measurements, is around 280 light years. This is considered an informal "equator star", as it lies less than a quarter of a degree south of the celestial equator. In 1900, it was 7 minutes of arc north of the equator. As a result of Earth's axial precession, it crossed over to the southern hemisphere in December 1923.

The variability of Alpha Sextantis was discovered by Aven Magded Hamadamen and included in the International Variable Star Index. The star undergoes pulsations with a period of 9.1 hours.

This is an evolved A-type giant star with a stellar classification of A0 III. It has around 2.5 times the mass of the Sun and three times the Sun's radius. The abundance of elements is similar to that in the Sun, but with a large uncertainty. It radiates 90 times the solar luminosity from its outer atmosphere at an effective temperature of 9,984 K. Alpha Sextantis is nearing the end of its life as a main-sequence star; it is around 385 million years old with a projected rotational velocity of 21 km/s.
