= Beta Sextantis =

Star in the constellation Sextans

β Sextantis
- Location of β Sextantis (circled in red)

Observation data Epoch J2000.0 Equinox J2000.0 (ICRS)
- Constellation: Sextans
- Right ascension: 10^{h} 30^{m} 17.48029^{s}
- Declination: −00° 38′ 13.3145″
- Apparent magnitude (V): 5.07

Characteristics
- Evolutionary stage: Main sequence
- Spectral type: B6 V or B5 IV/V
- U−B color index: −0.51
- B−V color index: −0.14
- Variable type: α^{2} CVn

Astrometry
Radial velocity (R_{v})	11.6±2.8 km/s
Proper motion (μ)	RA: −39.290 mas/yr Dec.: −23.582 mas/yr
Parallax (π)	8.8899±0.1477 mas
Distance	367 ± 6 ly (112 ± 2 pc)
Absolute magnitude (M_{V})	−0.38

Details
Mass	4.01±0.07 M_{☉}
Radius	3.00 R_{☉}
Luminosity	330 L_{☉}
Surface gravity (log g)	4.21 cgs
Temperature	13,870 K
Metallicity [Fe/H]	0.19 dex
Rotational velocity (v sin i)	85±4 km/s
Age	216 Myr

Other designations
- β Sex, 30 Sextantis, BD+00°2663, FK5 2841, HD 90994, HIP 51437, HR 4119, SAO 137608

Database references
SIMBAD	data

Beta Sextantis, Latinized from β Sextantis, is a variable star in the equatorial constellation of Sextans. With an apparent visual magnitude of 5.07, it is faintly visible to the naked eye on a dark night. According to the Bortle scale, it can be viewed from brighter lit suburban skies. The distance to this star, based upon an annual parallax shift of 8.89 mas, is around 367 light years.

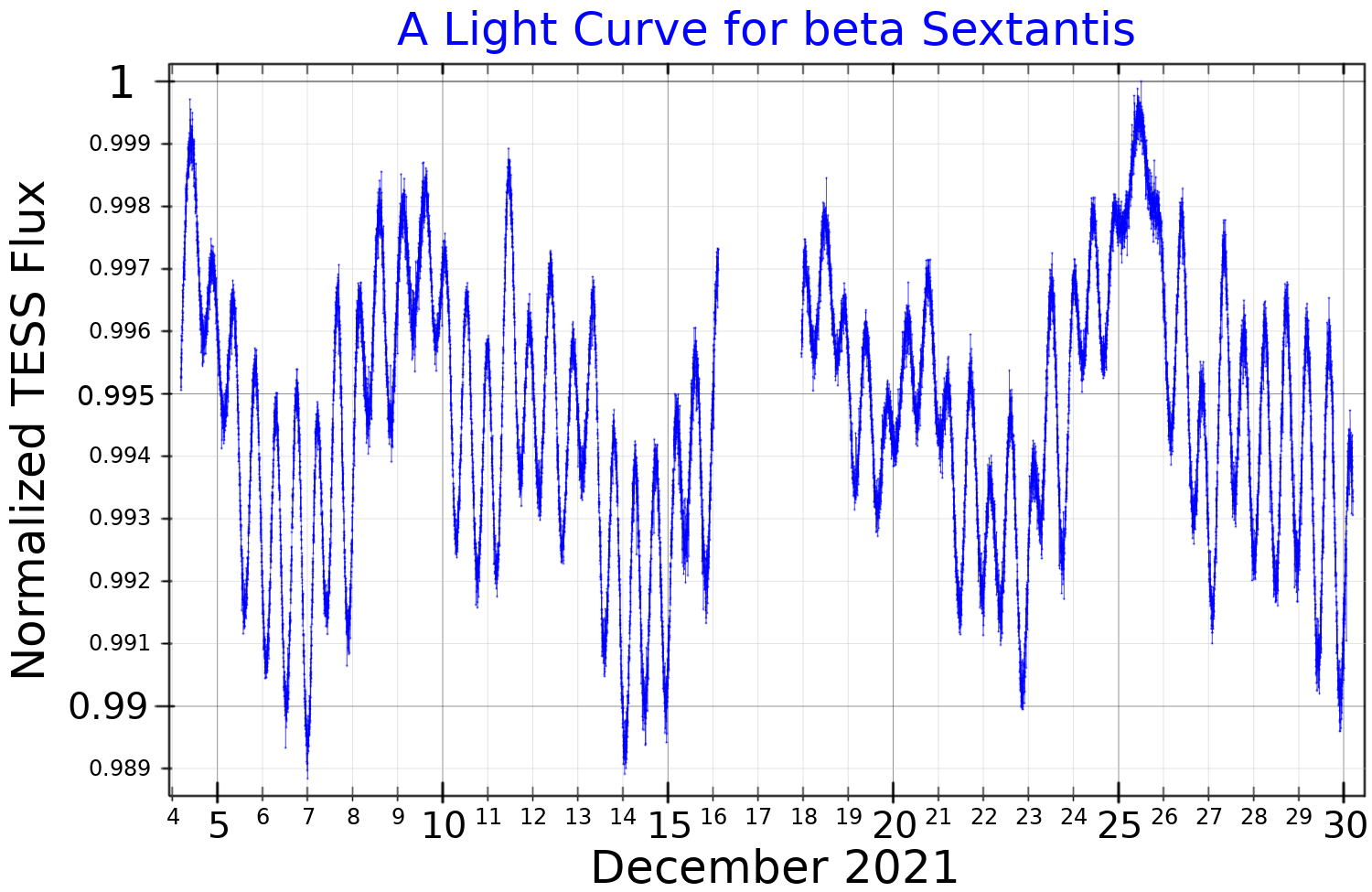
A light curve for Beta Sextantis, plotted from TESS data,

This star served as a primary standard in the MK spectral classification system with a stellar classification of B6 V, indicating that it is a B-type main sequence star. However, Houk and Swift (1999) list a classification of B5 IV/V, suggesting it may be transitioning into a subgiant star. Stellar evolution models support this is a main sequence star. It has served as a uvby photometric standard, but is also categorized as an Alpha^{2} Canum Venaticorum variable with a suspected period of 15.4 days. This lengthy a period conflicts with a relatively high projected rotational velocity of 85 km/s, leaving the explanation for the variance unresolved.
