= 23 Sextantis =

Variable Star in Constellation Sextans

- Location of 23 Sex on the map (circled in red)

Observation data Epoch J2000.0 Equinox ICRS
- Constellation: Sextans
- Right ascension: 10^{h} 21^{m} 02.01^{s}
- Declination: +02° 17′ 23.0″
- Apparent magnitude (V): 6.64–6.68

Characteristics
- Evolutionary stage: subgiant / main sequence star
- Spectral type: B2IV/V
- B−V color index: −0.094
- Variable type: β Cep + SPB candidate

Astrometry
| Radial velocity (R_{v}) | 5±4.4 km/s |
| Proper motion (μ) | RA: −8.900 mas/yr Dec.: −0.447 mas/yr |
| Parallax (π) | 1.1613±0.0659 mas |
| Distance | 2,800 ± 200 ly (860 ± 50 pc) |
| Absolute magnitude (M_{V}) | −2.6 |

Details
| Mass | 7.3 M_{☉} |
| Radius | 10.0 R_{☉} |
| Luminosity | 3,990 L_{☉} |
| Surface gravity (log g) | 4.03 cgs |
| Temperature | 17,947 K |
| Rotational velocity (v sin i) | 96.0 km/s |
| Age | 33 Myr |

Other designations
- 23 Sex, RS Sextantis, HD 89688, HIP 50684, HR 4064, SAO 118248

Database references
| SIMBAD | data |

23 Sextantis (also known as RS Sextantis), is a B-type star located in the equatorial constellation Sextans. The star has been identified as a pulsating variable candidate showing characteristics associated with both Beta Cephei variable and 53 Persei variable stars. It lies in the faint equatorial constellation Sextans.

== Early observations ==
Early spectroscopic and photometric observations of the star were reported by Sahade, Struve and A. D. Williams in 1956 after the star had been designated the variable star RS Sextantis in the seventh supplement of the General Catalogue of Variable Stars

The authors described the star as having a spectral type of B3 and an absolute magnitude of about −2.0, and noted that earlier photoelectric observations suggested it might belong to the β Canis Majoris (β Cephei) class with a period of roughly four hours.

Spectroscopic observations were obtained at Mount Wilson Observatory, while photometric measurements were carried out at Lick Observatory. The study also reported mean radial velocities of about +5 to +6 km/s from earlier catalogues, although the available photometric data at the time were considered insufficient to establish the star’s variability firmly.

== Stellar characteristics ==
23 Sextantis is spectroscopically classified as a B-type star. Photometric measurements indicate a small variation in brightness between visual magnitudes 6.64 and 6.68. The star has a B−V color index of −0.094.

Astrometric measurements from the Hipparcos mission give a parallax of 1.30 milliarcseconds. The star also shows a small proper motion across the sky.

== Variability ==
Observations have revealed small variations in brightness with an amplitude of only a few hundredths of a magnitude. The measured photometric period of approximately 0.1353 days (about 3.25 hours) places the star among short-period pulsating variables.

Because its observed properties overlap with those of both β Cephei variables and slowly pulsating B-type stars of the 53 Persei class, 23 Sextantis has been described as a possible candidate for either type of pulsating variable star.

== Interstellar medium ==
Spectroscopic studies of the sightline toward 23 Sextantis indicate the presence of intervening interstellar material associated with a molecular cloud. The stellar spectrum exhibits absorption features corresponding to neutral and ionised metals as well as simple molecules, demonstrating that both atomic and molecular gas are present along the line of sight.

Analysis of the Na I profile reveals several distinct velocity components, including a dominant feature near −1.6 km s−1 and additional components extending from approximately −20 to +20 km s−1, consistent with a multi-component interstellar structure.

The absorbing material is associated with a compact molecular cloud identified as DBB 354 at an estimated distance of about 1 kpc. The cloud appears to be both dense and small in scale, with a characteristic size of roughly 0.08 pc and particle densities of several thousand per cubic centimetre.

Infrared observations link this cloud to an IRAS source, suggesting that it may represent a previously unrecognized high-latitude molecular cloud.

== Designations ==
The star appears in several major stellar catalogues. In the Henry Draper Catalogue it is listed as HD 89688, while the Hipparcos catalogue designation is HIP 50684. Additional identifiers include HR 4064 in the Bright Star Catalogue and SAO 118248. Its Flamsteed designation, 23 Sextantis, reflects its approximate ordering by right ascension within the constellation Sextans.
