= Sextans =

Constellation on the celestial equator

- Constellation
- List of stars in Sextans
- Abbreviation: Sex
- Genitive: Sextantis, Sextansis
- Pronunciation: /ˈsɛkstənz/, genitive /sɛksˈtæntɪs/
- Symbolism: the Sextant
- Right ascension: 09^{h} 41^{m} 04.8653^{s}–10^{h} 51^{m} 30.2447^{s}
- Declination: 6.4327669°–−11.6621428°
- Quadrant: SQ2
- Area: 314 sq. deg. (47th)
- Main stars: 3
- Bayer/Flamsteed stars: 28
- Stars brighter than 3.00^{m}: 0
- Stars within 10.00 pc (32.62 ly): 5
- Brightest star: α Sex (4.49^{m})
- Nearest star: LHS 292
- Messier objects: 0
- Meteor showers: Sextantids
- Bordering constellations: Leo; Hydra; Crater
- Visible at latitudes between +78° and −84°. Best visible at 21:00 (9 p.m.) during the month of April.

Sextans is a faint, minor constellation on the celestial equator which was introduced in 1687 by Polish astronomer Johannes Hevelius. Its name is Latin for the astronomical sextant, an instrument that Hevelius made frequent use of in his observations.

== Characteristics ==
Sextans is a medium-sized constellation bordering Leo to the north, touching on Hydra to the southwest, and Crater to the southeast. The recommended three-letter abbreviation for the constellation, as adopted by the International Astronomical Union in 1922, is "Sex". The official constellation boundaries, as set by Belgian astronomer Eugène Delporte in 1930, are defined by a square. In the equatorial coordinate system, the right ascension coordinates of these borders lie between 09^{h} 41^{m} and 10^{h} 51^{m} , while the declination coordinates are between +6.43° and −11.7°. Since it is close to the ecliptic plane, the Moon and planets regularly cross the constellation, especially its northeastern corner.

== History ==
Sextans was introduced by Polish astronomer Johannes Hevelius in 1687, originally under the name Sextans Uraniae. The constellation was named in memory of the astronomical sextant he lost when his observatory was destroyed by fire on 26 September 1679, a catastrophe he later described in the preface to his Annus climactericus (1685). Despite the devastation, Hevelius rebuilt enough of his equipment to observe the great comet of December 1680. The constellation sits near the celestial equator, making it visible from most parts of the world.

== Features ==
=== Stars ===
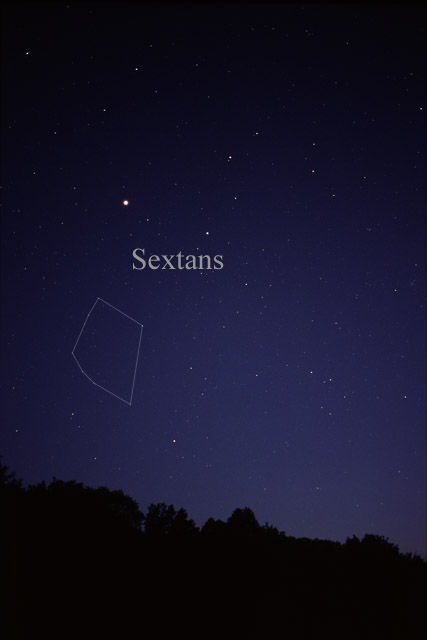
The constellation Sextans as it can be seen by the naked eye

John Flamsteed labeled 41 stars for the constellation. Francis Baily intended to give Bayer designations to some of the stars but because none of them were above magnitude 4.5, he left them unlettered. Rather, it was Benjamin Apthorp Gould who lettered some of the stars. He labeled the five brightest stars using Greek letters Alpha (α) to Epsilon (ε) in his Uranometria Argentina. All together, there are 38 stars that are brighter than or equal to apparent magnitude 6.5. (Note: Objects of magnitude 6.5 are among the faintest visible to the unaided eye in suburban–rural transition night skies.)

=== Bright stars ===
- Alpha Sextantis is the brightest star in the constellation and the only star above the fifth magnitude with an apparent magnitude of 4.49. It is an ageing A-type star of spectral class A0 III located 280±20 light-years away from the Solar System. At the age of 385 million years, it is exhausting hydrogen at its core and leaving the main sequence.
- γ Sextantis is the second brightest star in the constellation with an apparent magnitude of 5.05. It is a binary star consisting of two A-type main-sequence stars with classes of A1 V and A4 V respectively. The stars take 77.55 years to circle each other in an eccentric orbit and the system is located 280±10 light-years away from the Solar System. The separation of the stars is four-tenths of an arcsecond, making it difficult to observe without the use of a telescope with an aperture of 30 cm.
- β Sextantis is slightly fainter at magnitude 5.07; it is said to be 364±10 light-years distant. Beta Sextantis is a B-type main-sequence star of spectral class B6 V and it has been used as a standard in the MK spectral classification system. It is suspected to be a Alpha^{2} Canum Venaticorum variable with a period of 15.4 days.

=== Multiple star systems ===
Sextans contains a few notable multiple star systems within its boundaries.

35 Sextantis is a triple star system consisting of two evolved K-type giants of equal mass, with both stars being twice as massive as the Sun. The secondary is itself a single-lined spectroscopic binary consisting of a 0.58 M_{☉} companion and itself. The system is located approximately 700 light years away. The outer pair has a separation of 6.8" and both stars take roughly 23,000 years to orbit each other while the B subsystem takes 1,528 days to circle each other in a relatively eccentric orbit.

There are a few notable variable stars, including 25, 23 Sextantis, and LHS 292. NGC 3115, an edge-on lenticular galaxy, is the only noteworthy deep-sky object. It also lies near the ecliptic, which causes the Moon, and some of the planets to occasionally pass through it for brief periods of time.

The constellation is the location of the field studied by the COSMOS project, undertaken by the Hubble Space Telescope.

== COSMOS project ==
COSMOS-Gr30 is a particularly dense region in space that contains 10 individual galaxies

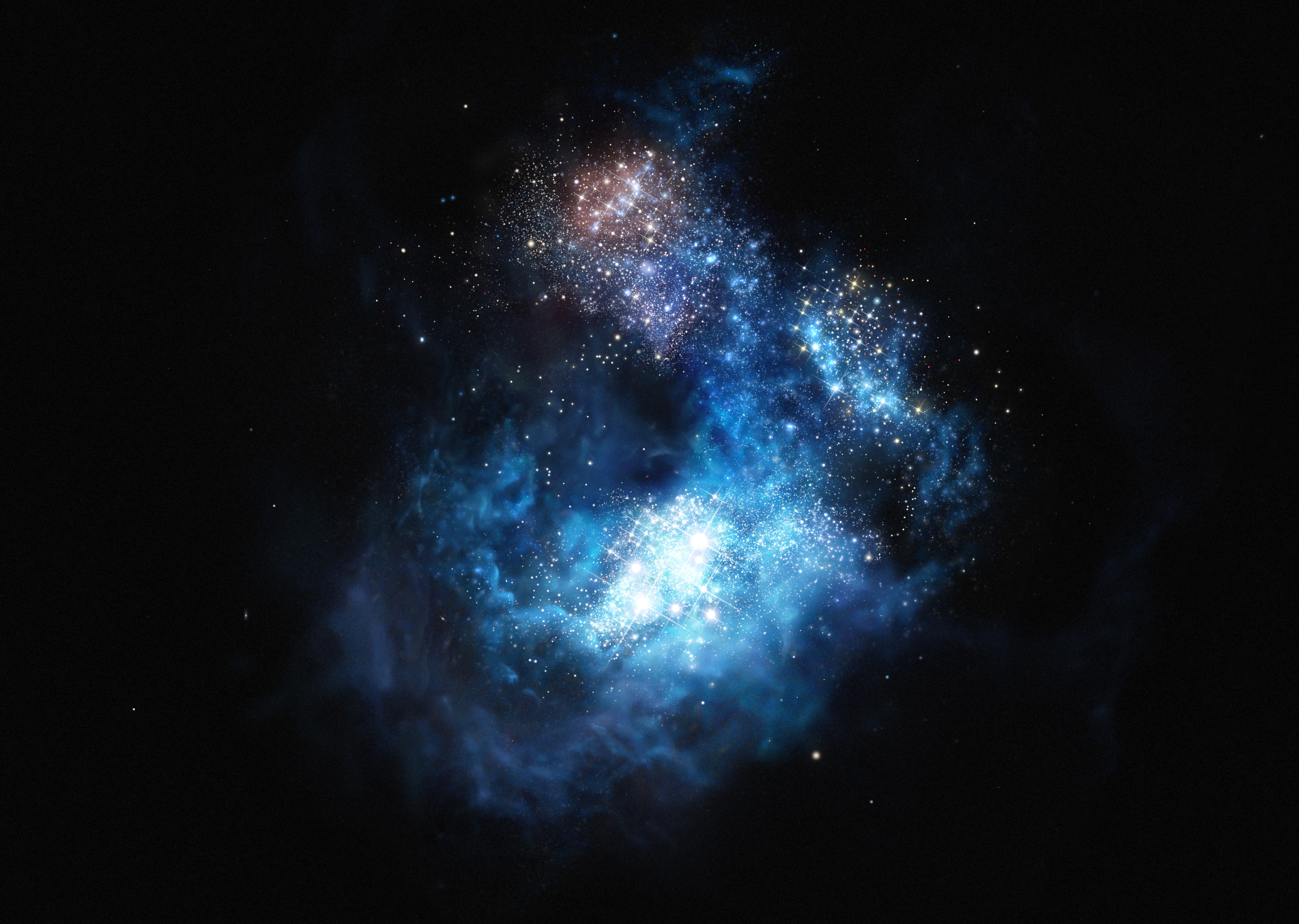
Cosmos Redshift 7, brightest galaxy in the early universe, is located in the constellation Sextans (artist concept)

Sextans B is a fairly bright dwarf irregular galaxy at magnitude 6.6, 4.3 million light-years from Earth. It is part of the Local Group of galaxies.

CL J1001+0220 is as of 2016 the most distant-known galaxy cluster at redshift z=2.506, 11.1 billion light-years from Earth.

In June 2015, astronomers reported evidence for population III stars in the Cosmos Redshift 7 galaxy (at z = 6.60) found in Sextans. Such stars are likely to have existed in the very early universe (i.e., at high redshift), and may have started the production of chemical elements heavier than hydrogen that are needed for the later formation of planets and life as we know it.

== Gallery ==
The constellation Sextans as depicted in Johann Doppelmayr's Atlas Coelestis, c. 1730 (Plate 19, Southern Celestial Hemisphere).

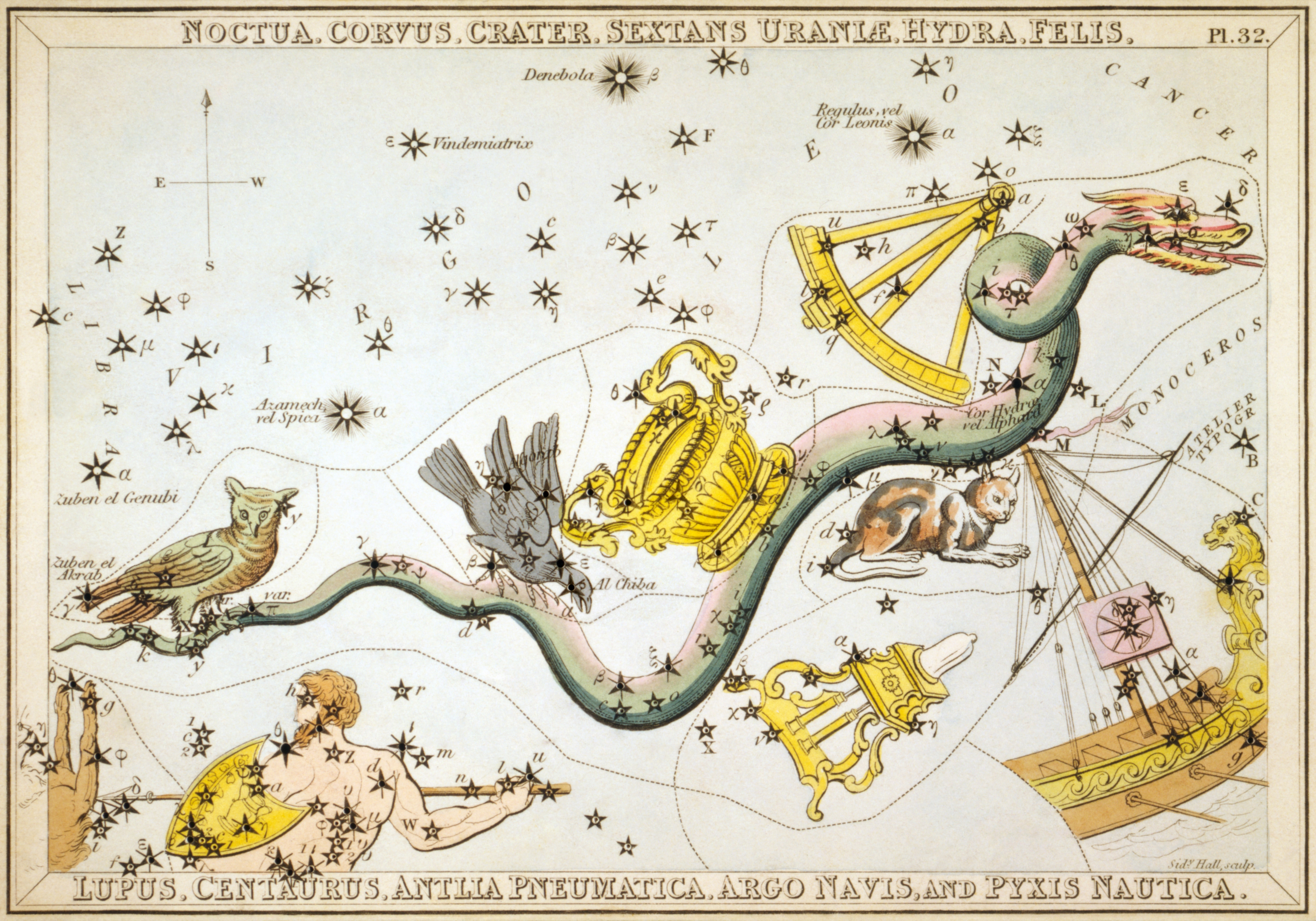
Sextans and other constellations seen around Hydra. From Urania's Mirror (1825)

== See also ==
- Sextans (Chinese astronomy)
