= List of stars in Lepus =

This is the list of notable stars in the constellation Lepus, sorted by decreasing brightness.

Name	B	F	Var	HD	HIP	RA	Dec	vis. mag.	abs. mag.	Dist. (ly)	Sp. class	Notes
α Lep	α	11		36673	25985	05^{h} 32^{m} 43.81^{s}	−17° 49′ 20.3″	2.58	−5.40	1283	F0Ib	Arneb (Elarneb), Arsh; suspected variable, V_{max} = 2.56^{m}, V_{min} = 2.62^{m}
β Lep	β	9		36079	25606	05^{h} 28^{m} 14.73^{s}	−20° 45′ 33.2″	2.81	−0.63	159	G5II	Nihal (Nibal)
ε Lep	ε	2		32887	23685	05^{h} 05^{m} 27.65^{s}	−22° 22′ 15.1″	3.19	−1.02	227	K4III	Ping, suspected variable, V_{max} = 3.12^{m}, V_{min} = 3.20^{m}
μ Lep	μ	5		33904	24305	05^{h} 12^{m} 55.87^{s}	−16° 12′ 19.5″	3.29	−0.47	184	B9IV: HgMn	Bade, α^{2} CVn variable, V_{max} = 2.97^{m}, V_{min} = 3.41^{m}, P = 2 d
ζ Lep	ζ	14		38678	27288	05^{h} 46^{m} 57.35^{s}	−14° 49′ 19.0″	3.55	1.89	70	A2Vann	Darlugal, has a possible asteroid belt
γ Lep	γ	13		38393	27072	05^{h} 44^{m} 27.97^{s}	−22° 26′ 51.0″	3.59	3.83	29	F7V	
η Lep	η	16		40136	28103	05^{h} 56^{m} 24.32^{s}	−14° 10′ 04.9″	3.71	2.82	49	F1V	
δ Lep	δ	15		39364	27654	05^{h} 51^{m} 19.15^{s}	−20° 52′ 39.0″	3.76	1.08	112	G8III/IV	
λ Lep	λ	6		34816	24845	05^{h} 19^{m} 34.53^{s}	−13° 10′ 36.4″	4.29	−3.30	1076	B0.5IV	
κ Lep	κ	4		33949	24327	05^{h} 13^{m} 13.89^{s}	−12° 56′ 28.6″	4.36	−1.81	559	B7V	suspected variable
ι Lep	ι	3		33802	24244	05^{h} 12^{m} 17.89^{s}	−11° 52′ 08.9″	4.45	0.11	241	B8V	
θ Lep	θ	18		41695	28910	06^{h} 06^{m} 09.33^{s}	−14° 56′ 07.0″	4.67	1.08	170	A0V	
HD 34968				34968	24927	05^{h} 20^{m} 26.91^{s}	−21° 14′ 23.1″	4.70	−1.04	459	A0V	suspected variable, V_{max} = 4.67^{m}, V_{min} = 4.72^{m}
HD 32309	υ			32309	23362	05^{h} 01^{m} 25.56^{s}	−20° 03′ 06.8″	4.91	0.88	209	B9V	
17 Lep	ρ	17	SS	41511	28816	06^{h} 04^{m} 59.13^{s}	−16° 29′ 03.9″	4.92	−2.66	1069	Ap shell	rotating ellipsoidal and Z And variable, V_{max} = 4.82^{m}, V_{min} = 5.06^{m}, P = 260.34 d
HD 32436	(ρ^{1})			32436	23430	05^{h} 02^{m} 09.77^{s}	−26° 16′ 29.4″	5.01	0.65	242	K1III	aka HR 1628
HD 41312	(υ)			41312	28675	06^{h} 03^{m} 15.56^{s}	−26° 17′ 05.1″	5.03	−0.35	388	K3II/IIICNv	
HD 34310				34310	24505	05^{h} 15^{m} 24.37^{s}	−26° 56′ 36.4″	5.06	0.45	272	B9V	
HD 35162				35162	25045	05^{h} 21^{m} 46.27^{s}	−24° 46′ 22.6″	5.06	0.28	294	A2/A3	
8 Lep	ξ	8		35337	25202	05^{h} 23^{m} 30.16^{s}	−13° 55′ 38.5″	5.25	−3.47	1811	B2IV	
19 Lep	τ	19		42042	29048	06^{h} 07^{m} 41.63^{s}	−19° 09′ 57.6″	5.28	−1.41	710	M1III	semiregular variable
ν Lep	ν	7		34863	24873	05^{h} 19^{m} 59.03^{s}	−12° 18′ 56.2″	5.29	0.25	332	B7/B8V	
HD 41841				41841	28943	06^{h} 06^{m} 32.10^{s}	−23° 06′ 38.8″	5.46	−0.36	475	A2V	
HD 34538				34538	24679	05^{h} 17^{m} 40.25^{s}	−13° 31′ 10.9″	5.48	2.06	158	G8IV	suspected variable, V_{max} = 5.38^{m}, V_{min} = 5.50^{m}
HD 39070				39070	27517	05^{h} 49^{m} 36.55^{s}	−14° 29′ 00.8″	5.49	0.60	310	G8III	
HD 42301				42301	29150	06^{h} 08^{m} 57.87^{s}	−22° 25′ 38.2″	5.49	1.02	255	A0V	
10 Lep	ο	10		36473	25853	05^{h} 31^{m} 07.62^{s}	−20° 51′ 48.8″	5.53	0.93	272	A0V	
HD 42341				42341	29205	06^{h} 09^{m} 34.53^{s}	−14° 35′ 04.9″	5.56	1.49	212	K2III	
RX Lep			RX	33664	24169	05^{h} 11^{m} 22.85^{s}	−11° 50′ 57.2″	5.60	−0.08	447	M6.2III	semiregular variable, V_{max} = 5.12^{m}, V_{min} = 6.65^{m}, P = 79.54 d
HD 32667				32667	23554	05^{h} 03^{m} 53.26^{s}	−24° 23′ 17.0″	5.61	1.72	196	A2IV	triple star system, aka HR 1645
HD 39853				39853	27938	05^{h} 54^{m} 43.59^{s}	−11° 46′ 27.3″	5.62	−1.18	746	K3 comp	suspected variable
HD 35505				35505	25280	05^{h} 24^{m} 28.47^{s}	−16° 58′ 32.7″	5.64	1.50	220	A0V	
HD 31925	φ			31925	23166	04^{h} 59^{m} 01.44^{s}	−16° 22′ 34.8″	5.65	2.47	141	F5V	suspected variable, V_{max} = 5.62^{m}, V_{min} = 5.69^{m}
HD 32890	(ρ^{2})			32890	23668	05^{h} 05^{m} 16.19^{s}	−26° 09′ 08.1″	5.71	1.37	240	K2III	
HD 42443				42443	29234	06^{h} 09^{m} 47.91^{s}	−22° 46′ 28.2″	5.71	2.04	176	F5V	
HD 42621				42621	29294	06^{h} 10^{m} 34.69^{s}	−27° 09′ 15.1″	5.72	0.68	331	K1III	
HD 38206	ω			38206	26966	05^{h} 43^{m} 21.66^{s}	−18° 33′ 26.8″	5.73	1.53	226	A0V	
1 Lep		1		32503	23474	05^{h} 02^{m} 44.94^{s}	−22° 47′ 42.3″	5.74	−0.29	524	K1IV	
YY Lep			YY	41933	28984	06^{h} 06^{m} 57.52^{s}	−21° 48′ 44.2″	5.74	−1.54	931	M3II/III	semiregular variable
HD 35736				35736	25397	05^{h} 25^{m} 59.82^{s}	−19° 41′ 43.3″	5.78	2.61	140	F5V	
HD 39190				39190	27533	05^{h} 49^{m} 53.51^{s}	−22° 58′ 18.9″	5.87	−0.49	610	A1V	
12 Lep	π	12		38090	26865	05^{h} 42^{m} 13.96^{s}	−22° 22′ 25.5″	5.88	−0.97	765	A2/A3V	
HD 40151				40151	28085	05^{h} 56^{m} 14.20^{s}	−22° 50′ 24.2″	5.95	1.19	292	K0/K1III	
HD 34721				34721	24786	05^{h} 18^{m} 50.24^{s}	−18° 07′ 48.7″	5.96	3.98	81	G0V	
HD 33093				33093	23831	05^{h} 07^{m} 24.88^{s}	−12° 29′ 27.6″	5.97	3.17	118	G2V	suspected variable
HD 32996				32996	23777	05^{h} 06^{m} 36.73^{s}	−13° 07′ 21.6″	6.04	0.81	363	B9.5/A0IV	
HD 40972				40972	28520	06^{h} 01^{m} 13.11^{s}	−25° 25′ 03.8″	6.04	0.81	363	A0V	
HD 35991				35991	25532	05^{h} 27^{m} 36.49^{s}	−21° 22′ 32.8″	6.08	0.75	380	K0III	
HD 42729				42729	29347	06^{h} 11^{m} 13.66^{s}	−26° 28′ 55.6″	6.08	−0.50	675	B9.5IV/V	
HD 37306				37306	26395	05^{h} 37^{m} 08.76^{s}	−11° 46′ 31.7″	6.10	2.00	215	A2V	
HD 38054				38054	26866	05^{h} 42^{m} 14.49^{s}	−17° 31′ 49.4″	6.15	−0.16	597	K3III	
HD 38392			AK	38392		05^{h} 44^{m} 26.50^{s}	−22° 25′ 18.0″	6.15			K2V	common proper motion with γ Lep; BY Draconis variable, ΔV = 0.06^{m}, P = 21.4 d
HD 39385				39385	27670	05^{h} 51^{m} 28.62^{s}	−22° 55′ 36.6″	6.16	0.49	443	K0IIICN...	
HD 38713				38713	27308	05^{h} 47^{m} 07.81^{s}	−16° 14′ 17.0″	6.18	−0.36	664	G8III	
HD 41125				41125	28622	06^{h} 02^{m} 33.81^{s}	−14° 29′ 49.9″	6.20	0.58	434	K0III	
HD 40745			AC	40745	28434	06^{h} 00^{m} 17.66^{s}	−12° 53′ 59.7″	6.21	2.32	195	F2IV	γ Doradus variable
HD 34045				34045	24394	05^{h} 13^{m} 59.94^{s}	−14° 36′ 24.7″	6.22	1.84	245	A9II/III	
HD 37971				37971	26821	05^{h} 41^{m} 41.51^{s}	−16° 43′ 33.0″	6.22	−1.65	1221	B4/B5III	
HD 42486				42486	29233	06^{h} 09^{m} 47.16^{s}	−26° 42′ 04.0″	6.27	0.64	435	G8/K0III	
HD 35850			AF	35850	25486	05^{h} 27^{m} 04.75^{s}	−11° 54′ 03.0″	6.30	4.16	87	F7V:	RS CVn variable, V_{max} = 6.26^{m}, V_{min} = 6.35^{m}, P = 1 d
HD 33162				33162	23874	05^{h} 07^{m} 49.82^{s}	−12° 35′ 32.8″	6.33	−0.52	763	M1III	semiregular variable, V_{max} = 6.28^{m}, V_{min} = 6.40^{m}, P = 16.62 d
HD 38382				38382	27075	05^{h} 44^{m} 28.41^{s}	−20° 07′ 36.0″	6.34	4.30	83	F8/G0V	
HD 42327				42327	29178	06^{h} 09^{m} 20.20^{s}	−18° 07′ 34.8″	6.36	0.86	410	B9Vn...	
HD 34798			YZ	34798	24825	05^{h} 19^{m} 17.44^{s}	−18° 31′ 11.8″	6.37	−0.56	791	B5IV/V	53 Per variable
HD 40235				40235	28118	05^{h} 56^{m} 34.43^{s}	−23° 12′ 55.4″	6.37	0.44	499	K0III	
HD 33238				33238	23908	05^{h} 08^{m} 13.26^{s}	−15° 05′ 43.3″	6.38	−0.31	710	K1III + F/G	
HD 33667				33667	24114	05^{h} 10^{m} 44.59^{s}	−25° 54′ 37.9″	6.40	−0.33	724	K1III/IV	
HD 37643				37643	26602	05^{h} 39^{m} 16.23^{s}	−17° 50′ 57.9″	6.40	−1.61	1304	B4	
HD 32612				32612	23551	05^{h} 03^{m} 52.12^{s}	−14° 22′ 12.9″	6.42	−1.62	1320	B2IV	
HD 34318				34318	24560	05^{h} 16^{m} 10.56^{s}	−11° 21′ 09.2″	6.45	−0.60	838	G0	
HD 33095	ψ			33095	23818	05^{h} 07^{m} 09.78^{s}	−19° 23′ 33.1″	6.47	3.58	123	G2V	
HD 35137				35137	25059	05^{h} 21^{m} 55.31^{s}	−17° 36′ 13.1″	6.47	0.72	461	K0III	
HD 35386				35386	25180	05^{h} 23^{m} 11.98^{s}	−26° 42′ 19.8″	6.49	2.89	171	F6V	
HD 34797			TX	34797	24827	05^{h} 19^{m} 18.31^{s}	−18° 30′ 34.4″	6.54		799	B7Vp	α^{2} CVn variable, ΔV = 0.04^{m}, P = 2.28715 d
HD 40379	σ			40379	28201	05^{h} 57^{m} 33.30^{s}	–18° 03′ 18.7″	6.67		290	F6V	
S Lep			S	41698	28874	06^{h} 05^{m} 45.54^{s}	−24° 11′ 43.9″	6.74	−0.46	898	M5III	semiregular variable, V_{max} = 6^{m}, V_{min} = 7.58^{m}, P = 97.3 d
HD 42659			UV	42659	29365	06^{h} 11^{m} 21.75^{s}	−15° 47′ 35.0″	6.77		429	Ap...	rapidly oscillating Ap star
4 Mon		(4)		42116	29118	06^{h} 08^{m} 25.39^{s}	−11° 08′ 46.6″	6.90	1.80	342	A2	
HD 37847			TW	37847	26714	05^{h} 40^{m} 39.72^{s}	−20° 17′ 55.6″	7.00		720	K0IV	RS CVn variable, ΔV = 0.32^{m}, P = 28.84338 d
HD 33844				33844	24275	05^{h} 12^{m} 36.08^{s}	−14° 57′ 04.27″	7.30		329		has two planets (b and c)
T Lep			T	32803	23636	05^{h} 04^{m} 50.85^{s}	−21° 54′ 16.5″	7.40		2670	M6ev	Mira variable, V_{max} = 7.4^{m}, V_{min} = 14.3^{m}, P = 372 d
HD 31527				31527	22905	04^{h} 55^{m} 38^{s}	−23° 14′ 31″	7.48		126	G0V	has three planets (b, c and d)
R Lep			R	31996	23203	04^{h} 59^{m} 36.50^{s}	−14° 48′ 21.0″	7.71		1350	C7,6e	Hind's Crimson Star; Mira variable, V_{max} = 5.5^{m}, V_{min} = 11.7^{m}, P = 445 d
HD 33283				33283	23889	05^{h} 08^{m} 01.01^{s}	−26° 47′ 50.9″	8.05	3.36	282	G4V	has a planet (b)
HD 33142				33142	23844	05^{h} 07^{m} 36^{s}	−13° 59′ 11″	8.13		411	K0III	has a planet (b)
Gliese 229				42581	29295	06^{h} 10^{m} 34.62^{s}	−21° 51′ 52.7″	8.14	9.33	19	M1/M2V	suspected flare star; has a brown dwarf companion
RY Lep			RY	38882	27400	05^{h} 48^{m} 10.25^{s}	−20° 01′ 25.0″	8.25		647	A9V	δ Sct variable, V_{max} = 8.05^{m}, V_{min} = 8.46^{m}, P = 0.2251475 d
HD 32450				32450	23452	05^{h} 02^{m} 28.42^{s}	−21° 15′ 23.9″	8.32		27.961	M0V	
RS Lep			RS	40640		05^{h} 59^{m} 18.42^{s}	−20° 13′ 25.1″	9.88			A0V	Algol variable, V_{max} = 9.91^{m}, V_{min} = 10.38^{m}, P = 1.2885439 d
TOI-421						05^{h} 27^{m} 24.83^{s}	−14° 16′ 37.0″	9.93		245	G9V	has a red dwarf visual binary; has two transiting planets (b, c)
U Lep			U	31599	22952	04^{h} 56^{m} 17.99^{s}	−21° 13′ 02.0″	10.52		1910	A9/F0Iab:	RR Lyr variable, V_{max} = 9.890^{m}, V_{min} = 11.093^{m}, P = 0.5814789 d
WASP-61						05^{h} 01^{m} 12.0^{s}	−26° 03′ 15″	12.5		1566	F7	has a transiting planet (b)
WASP-49						06^{h} 04^{m} 21.47^{s}	−16° 57′ 55″	11.35		638	G6	has a transiting planet (b)
Table legend: • Name = Proper name • B = Bayer designation • F or/and G. = Flamsteed designation or Gould designation • Var = Variable star designation • HD = Henry Draper Catalogue designation number • HIP = Hipparcos Catalogue designation number • RA = Right ascension for the Epoch/Equinox J2000.0 • Dec = Declination for the Epoch/Equinox J2000.0 • vis. mag. = visual magnitude (m or m_{v}), also known as apparent magnitude • abs. mag. = absolute magnitude (M_{v}) • Dist. (ly) = Distance in light-years from Earth • Sp. class = Spectral class of the star in the stellar classification system • Notes = Common name(s) or alternate name(s); comments; notable properties [for example: multiple star status, range of variability if it is a variable star, exoplanets, etc.]
