= List of star systems within 300–350 light-years =

This is a list of star systems within 300–350 light years of Earth.

== List ==
Key
#	Visible to the unaided eye
$	Bright star (absolute magnitude of +8.5 or brighter)
‡	White dwarf
§	Brown dwarf or sub-brown dwarf
*	Nearest in constellation

System	Star or (sub-) brown dwarf	Distance (ly)	Constellation	Coordinates: RA, Dec (Ep J2000, Eq J2000)	Stellar class	Apparent magnitude (V)	Parallax (mas)	Notes and additional references
Mira (Omicron Ceti)	A	300	Cetus		M7 IIIe	2.0 to 10.1		
Mira (Omicron Ceti)	B (VZ Ceti)	300	Cetus		DA			
Delta Sextantis		300	Sextans		B9.5V			
Zeta Phoenicis (Wurren)	A	300 ± 10	Phoenix		B6 V	3.9 to 4.4		
Zeta Phoenicis (Wurren)	B	300 ± 10	Phoenix		B8 V			
HD 118203 (Liesma)		300.2 ± 0.5			G0V	8.06		Has two known exoplanets, one of them is named HD 118203 b/Staburags.
HAT-P-17		301.5 ± 0.5			K	10.38		Has two confirmed exoplanet (HAT-P-17b & c).
Thuban (Alpha Draconis)	A	303 ± 5	Draco		A0IV	3.67		
Thuban (Alpha Draconis)	B	303 ± 5	Draco		A1V			
HD 205739 (Sāmaya)		303.1 ± 0.6			F7 V	8.56		
BW Sculptoris	A	305 ± 1	Sculptor		D	16.5		
BW Sculptoris	B	305 ± 1	Sculptor		T			
SZ Piscium	A	306 ± 5	Pisces		K1IV	7.18		
SZ Piscium	B	306 ± 5	Pisces		F8V			
Eta Centauri		306 ± 6	Centaurus		B1.5 Vne	+2.35		
YSES 1 (TYC 8998-760-1)		307.3 ± 0.3			K3IV	11.19		Has two confirmed exoplanet (YSES-1b & c).
Rho Persei (Gorgonea Tertia)		308 ± 7	Perseus		M4 II	+1.65		
HD 224693 (Axólotl)		308.3 ± 0.8			G2V or G2IV	8.23		Has one confirmed exoplanet (HD 224693 b/Xólotl).
HD 104430		309			A1V			
HR 4729 (HD 108250)	A	309 ± 7	Crux		B5V	4.79		Part of Acrux System.
HR 4729 (HD 108250)	B	309 ± 7	Crux		GV			Part of Acrux System.
HR 4729 (HD 108250)	Alpha¹ Crucis CP	309 ± 7	Crux		M0V			Part of Acrux System.
Canopus (Alpha Carinae)$		310 ± 20	Carina	06^{h} 23^{m} 57.10988^{s} −52° 41′ 44.3810″	A9II	-0.74#	10.55±0.56	Second brightest star in the night sky as seen from Earth, and the closest yellow supergiant star. One of the closest core-collapse supernova candidates.
Beta Hydrae	A	310 ± 20	Hydra		B9IIIp Si	4.29		
Beta Hydrae	B	310 ± 20	Hydra		kB8hB8HeA0VSi			
Beta¹ Sagittarii (Arkab Prior)	A	310	Sagittarius		B9V	+4.01		
Beta¹ Sagittarii (Arkab Prior)	B	310	Sagittarius		A5V			
CW Leonis		310	Leo		C9,5e	14.5		The closest carbon star.
23 Comae Berenices (Phyllon Kissinou)		310 ± 20	Coma Berenices		A0IV	4.80		
TOI-763		311			G			Has two confirmed and one unconfirmed exoplanets.
SSSPM J1549-3544		313.2 ± 0.6	Lupus		sdK5	14.78		
Kappa Cephei		314	Cepheus		B9III			
TOI-3493		315.59±0.65			G0			Has one known exoplanet.
HD 108501		317			A0Vn			
Tau² Aquarii		318 ± 9	Aquarius		K5 III	+4.042		
W Hydrae		319	Hydra		M7.5e-M9	7.7 - 11.6		
Gamma Scuti		319 ± 8	Scutum		A2:V	4.67		
108 Aquarii (i³ Aquarii)		319 ± 10	Aquarius		A0VpSiSr	5.194		
HD 136418 (Nikawiy)		320			G			
Acrux (Alpha Crucis)	Alpha¹ Crucis Aa	320 ± 20	Crux		B0.5IV	0.76		One of the closest core-collapse supernova candidates to Earth.
Acrux (Alpha Crucis)	Alpha¹ Crucis Ab	320 ± 20	Crux		B7V			One of the closest core-collapse supernova candidates to Earth.
Acrux (Alpha Crucis)	Alpha² Crucis	320 ± 20	Crux		B1Vn			One of the closest core-collapse supernova candidates to Earth.
Alpha Antliae		320 ± 10	Antlia		K4III	4.25		
Delta Sextantis		321	Sextans		B9V			
HD 77946		322.7±1			F5			Has one known exoplanet.
Eta Chamaeleontis		325 ± 3	Chamaeleon		B8V	5.453		
Tau² Aquarii		326 ± 6	Aquarius		K5 III or M0 III	4.042		
100 parsecs (about 326.16 ly)
AI Velorum		327.1 ± 0.6	Vela		A9IV/V	6.15 to 6.76		
HD 104985 (Tonatiuh)		329 ± 1			G8.5IIIb	5.78		
Lambda Leonis (Alterf)		329 ± 6	Leo		K4.5 III	4.32		
Theta Scorpii (Sargas)		329 ± 9	Scorpius		F0Ib-F1III	1.84		
Epsilon Delphini (Aldulfin)		330 ± 7		Delphinus	B6III	4.03		
Zeta Draconis (Aldhibah)		330 ± 10	Draco		B6III	+3.17		
HD 129116 (b Centauri)		330 ± 10			B3V	4.01		Has one confirmed exoplanet (b Centauri b).
ESO 439-26		330 ± 20			DC9	+20.52		Least luminous white dwarf star.
WD 0137−349	A	331 ± 1			DA	+15.33 ± 0.02		
WD 0137−349	B	331 ± 1			L8/T			
49 Andromedae (a Andromedae)$		333 ± 4	Andromeda	01^{h} 30^{m} 06.10151^{s} +47° 00′ 26.1811″	K0III	5.269#	9.7947±0.1166	
Lambda Draconis (Giausar)		333 ± 5	Draco		M0III-IIIa Ca1	3.85		
K2-229		335 ± 4			K2V	10.985		Has three exoplanets.
HD 106906		337 ± 1			F5 V	7.80		
Omicron Herculis		338 ± 6	Hercules		B9.5III	3.83		
HD 165634	A	339 ± 9			G7:IIIb CN−1 CH−3.5 HK+1	4.56		
HD 165634	B	339 ± 9			D			
HD 86081 (Bibhā)		340 ± 2			G1V	8.73		
28 Aquilae (V1208 Aquilae)		340 ± 3	Aquila		F0III	5.51 - 5.56		
Mu¹ Crucis		340 ± 10	Crux		B2IV-V	4.03		
Theta Antliae	A	340 ± 20	Antlia		A8Vm	4.79		
Theta Antliae	B	340 ± 20	Antlia		G7III			
HD 107696		342			B9V			
Omega Carinae		342 ± 3	Carina		B8 IIIe	3.29		
Psi Phoenicis		342 ± 7	Phoenix		M4III	4.41		
Delta Crucis (Imai)		345 ± 5	Crux		B2IV	2.78 - 2.84		
HIP 41378		345.7 ± 0.8			F8	8.92		Has 5 confirmed and 2 unconfirmed exoplanets.
Zeta¹ Antliae B		347 ± 2	Antlia		A2 V	5.76		
Delta Sagittarii (Kaus Media)	A	348 ± 7	Sagittarius		K3 III	+2.70		
Delta Sagittarii (Kaus Media)	B	348 ± 7	Sagittarius		D			
System	Star or (sub-) brown dwarf	Distance (ly)	Constellation	Coordinates: RA, Dec (Ep J2000, Eq J2000)	Stellar class	Apparent magnitude (V)	Parallax (mas)	Notes and additional references

== See also ==
- List of star systems within 250–300 light-years
- List of star systems within 350–400 light-years
