= T Leporis =

Star in the constellation Lepus

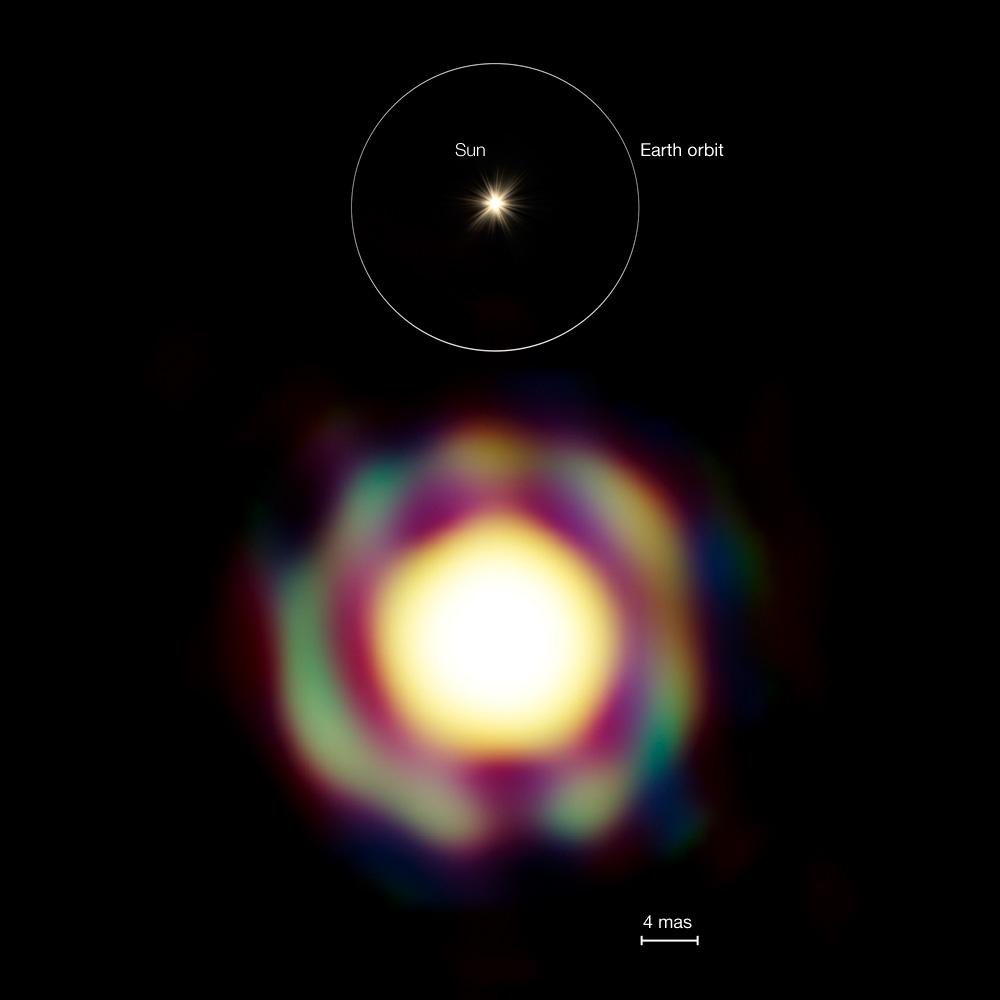
- T Leporis (below) compared to the Sun and Earth's orbit (above)

Observation data Epoch J2000.0 Equinox J2000.0 (ICRS)
- Constellation: Lepus
- Right ascension: 05^{h} 04^{m} 50.85^{s}
- Declination: −21° 54′ 16.5″
- Apparent magnitude (V): 7.4 - 14.3

Characteristics
- Spectral type: M6e-M9e
- Variable type: Mira

Astrometry
Radial velocity (R_{v})	−4 km/s
Proper motion (μ)	RA: +13.59 mas/yr Dec.: −34.55 mas/yr
Parallax (π)	3.06±0.04 mas
Distance	1,066±13 ly (327±4 pc)

Details
Mass	2.7 M_{☉}
Radius	204 R_{☉}
Surface gravity (log g)	−0.5 cgs
Temperature	2,800 K

Other designations
- T Lep, BD−22°995, CD−22°995, HD 32803, HIP 23636

Database references
SIMBAD	data

T Leporis (T Lep / HD 32803 / HIP 23636) is a variable star in the constellation of Lepus, the Hare. It is located half a degree from ε Leporis in the sky; its distance is approximately 1,100 light years from the Solar System. It has the spectral type M6ev, and is a Mira variable — as is R Leporis, in the same constellation — whose apparent magnitude varies between +7.40 and +14.30 with a period of 368.13 days.

The annual parallax of T Leporis was measured by the Hipparcos mission, but the results were hopelessly imprecise. The parallax from Gaia Data Release 2 is more accurate and yields a distance of 340±20 pc. The distance has also been measured using very-long-baseline interferometry and found to be 327±4 pc.

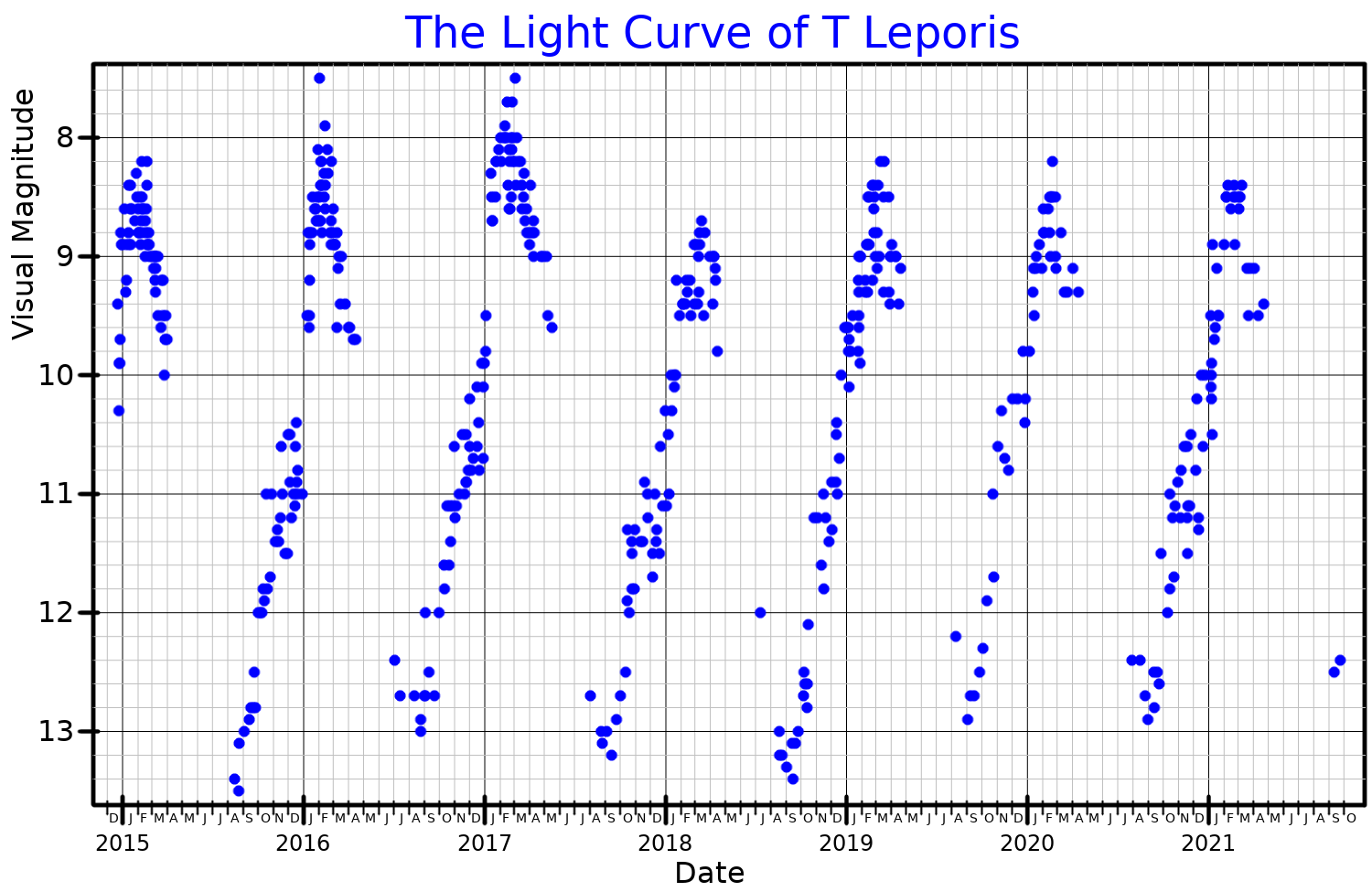
The visual band light curve of T Leporis, from AAVSO data

Mira variables are some of the major sources of molecules and dust in the Universe. With each pulsation, T Leporis expels matter into space, each year losing an amount equivalent to the mass of Earth. Images of T Leporis obtained with the Very Large Telescope interferometer of the European Southern Observatory (ESO) have revealed a shell of gas and dust surrounding the star, whose diameter is some 100 times larger than that of the Sun. Given the great distance at which this class of stars lie, its apparent angular diameter — despite its enormous size — is no more than a millionth of the solar apparent angular diameter.

== See also ==
- Mira
- R Leporis
