= Staburags =

Staburags may refer to:

- Staburags, alternative name of Staburadze, a cliff in Latvia.
- Staburags, official name of extra solar planet HD 118203 b.
