= Xolotl (disambiguation) =

Xolotl may refer to:

- Xolotl, an Aztec and central Mexican deity associated with lightning and death
- King Xolotl, a semi-legendary 13th century Chichimec leader
- Codex Xolotl, a pictographic codex from Central Mexico, recounting a traditional history of the Valley of Mexico
- HD 224693 b, an exoplanet named Xólotl
