= HD 33283 b =

Extrasolar planet in the constellation Lepus

Discovery
- Discovered by: Johnson et al.
- Discovery site: United States
- Discovery date: April 17, 2006
- Detection method: Doppler spectroscopy

Orbital characteristics
- Semi-major axis: 0.1508±0.0087 AU
- Eccentricity: 0.399±0.056
- Orbital period (sidereal): 18.1991±0.0017 d
- Time of periastron: 2,463,017.31±0.29
- Argument of periastron: 155.5±7.1
- Semi-amplitude: 22.4±1.6
- Star: HD 33283

HD 33283 b is an exoplanet orbiting around HD 33283. The mass of the planet is about one-third that of Jupiter or about the same as Saturn. However, the planet orbits very close to the star, taking only 18 days to complete its orbit with average speed of 86.5 km/s (311,000 km/h). Despite this, its orbit is eccentric, bringing it as close as 0.075 AU to the star and as far away as 0.215 AU.

== See also ==
- HD 33564 b
- HD 86081 b
- HD 224693 b
