= Epsilon Leporis =

Star in the constellation Lepus

ε Leporis
- Location of ε Leporis (circled)

Observation data Epoch J2000.0 Equinox ICRS
- Constellation: Lepus
- Right ascension: 05^{h} 05^{m} 27.66537^{s}
- Declination: −22° 22′ 15.7239″
- Apparent magnitude (V): +3.166

Characteristics
- Spectral type: K4 III
- U−B color index: +1.783
- B−V color index: +1.478

Astrometry
Radial velocity (R_{v})	+1.0 km/s
Proper motion (μ)	RA: +21.13 mas/yr Dec.: −73.11 mas/yr
Parallax (π)	15.5999±0.1074 mas
Distance	209 ± 1 ly (64.1 ± 0.4 pc)
Absolute magnitude (M_{V})	−1.02±0.10

Details
Mass	1.70±0.19 M_{☉}
Radius	40.1±3.2 R_{☉}
Luminosity	372 L_{☉}
Surface gravity (log g)	1.43±0.09 cgs
Temperature	4,131 K
Metallicity [Fe/H]	−0.02 dex
Age	1.72±0.47 Gyr

Other designations
- Ping, ε Lep, 2 Leporis, NSV 1826, BD−22°1000, FK5 186, HD 32887, HIP 23685, HR 1654, SAO 170051

Database references
SIMBAD	data

Epsilon Leporis, Latinized from ε Leporis, formally named Ping, is a third-magnitude star in the southern constellation Lepus. The apparent visual magnitude of +3.166 places it third in brightness among the stars in this constellation. Based upon parallax measurements, it is located at a distance of around 213 light-years (65 parsecs) from Earth.

This is an evolved giant star with a stellar classification of K4 III that has expanded to 40 times the Sun's radius. It is about 1.72 billion years old and has 1.70 times the mass of the Sun, with a luminosity 372 times as great. The outer atmosphere is cooler than the Sun's with an effective temperature of 4,131 K, giving it the orange hue of a K-type star. In terms of its composition, this star shows a similar abundance of elements other than hydrogen and helium to the Sun.

The envelope of this star is undergoing oscillations that show up as changes in the star's radial velocity. Over long durations these follow a linear trend, in combination with shorter period oscillations occurring over a few days. These oscillations are unlikely to be the result of rotational module as that would imply a high rotation rate, which would display itself through strong X-ray emissions. Instead, they may be the result of solar-like and Mira-like oscillations.

== Nomenclature ==
Epsilon Leporis, Latinized from ε Leporis, is the star's Bayer designation.

In Chinese astronomy, ε Leporis forms with μ Leporis the asterism Ping (屏), representing a screen in front of a toilet. The IAU Working Group on Star Names approved the name Ping for ε Leporis on 22 March 2026.
