= HD 33142 =

K-type giant star in the constellation Lepus

- Location of HD 33142 (circled)

Observation data Epoch J2000.0 Equinox ICRS
- Constellation: Lepus
- Right ascension: 05^{h} 07^{m} 35.54139^{s}
- Declination: −13° 59′ 11.3368″
- Apparent magnitude (V): 7.96

Characteristics
- Evolutionary stage: Red giant branch
- Spectral type: K0III
- B−V color index: 0.935
- J−H color index: 0.442
- J−K color index: 0.553

Astrometry
Radial velocity (R_{v})	33.980499 km/s
Proper motion (μ)	RA: -7.488 mas/yr Dec.: +33.693 mas/yr
Parallax (π)	8.2719±0.0202 mas
Distance	394.3 ± 1.0 ly (120.9 ± 0.3 pc)
Absolute magnitude (M_{V})	+2.48

Details
Mass	1.52±0.03 M_{☉}
Radius	4.17+0.03 −0.07 R_{☉}
Luminosity	10.00+0.09 −0.23 L_{☉}
Surface gravity (log g)	3.375+0.021 −0.002 cgs
Temperature	5025.4+23.6 −15.5 K
Metallicity [Fe/H]	0.06±0.01 dex
Rotational velocity (v sin i)	≤2 km/s
Age	2.72+0.14 −0.13 Gyr

Other designations
- BD−14° 1051, GC 2232, HD 33142, HIP 23844, SAO 150161, PPM 215317, TIC 169397663, TYC 5342-891-1, GSC 05342-00891, 2MASS J05073553-1359113, Gaia DR3 2986948238799721216

Database references
SIMBAD	data
Exoplanet Archive	data

HD 33142 is a solitary 8th-magnitude red giant located about 394 light-years (121 pc) away in the southern constellation of Lepus. It is orbited by three confirmed exoplanets, namely the Jupiter-sized planets HD 33142 b and c, and a Saturn-like planet, d, located closer to the star.

== Stellar characteristics ==
HD 33142 belongs to a class of "retired A stars," meaning it was likely once an A-type main-sequence star but has since evolved past the main sequence. Now, it is entering the red-giant branch with a spectral type of K0 III, a radius of 4.17 R_{☉}, and a mass of 1.52 M_{☉}. The effective temperature of HD 33142 is estimated to be about 5,025 K (4,752 °C; 8,585 °F), giving it an orange color. The star is ten times as bright as the Sun, which, combined with its distance from Earth, places its apparent magnitude at 7.96, making it too faint to be visible by the naked eye under most circumstances, but it can be observed using binoculars. It has a solar-like metallicity of 0.06, which translates to an iron abundance 15% higher than the Sun. The star is aged approximately 2.72 billion years, making it three-fifths as old as the Solar System (4.568 billion years old).

The star's rotation period has been measured to be about 106 days from rotational broadening (i.e., Doppler broadening caused by the star's rotation), but this value is very uncertain as only the upper limit of the rotation velocity is known and the axial tilt is entirely undetermined. Light curves obtained by the TESS reveal no transit signals and suggest that the star is photometrically quiet. Archived data from Hipparcos photometry generally agree with this, with no indication of variability.

== Planetary system ==
In 2011, Johnson et al. reported the discovery of a Jovian planet, HD 33142 b, alongside 17 other planets orbiting retired A stars. It revolves around the star in an Earth-like circular (eccentricity 0.049) orbit that lasts 330 days (0.90 years) each, and has an estimated minimum mass of 1.26 M_{J}.

The second planet, c, was discovered by Bryan et al. in 2016, and was initially described as a super-Jupiter with a minimum mass of 5.97 M_{J} and an orbital period of 834 ± 29 days (2.283 ± 0.079 years). A 2019 follow-up study by Luhn et al., independently reported radial velocity signals that indicated the existence of a planet with a similar period of 809 ± 26 days (2.215 ± 0.071 years), but with a far smaller mass of 0.62 M_{J}. A 2022 study by Trifonov et al. seems to agree more with the latter, confirming an 810-day period planet weighing at least 0.89 M_{J}. Its orbit has a low eccentricity and a semi-major axis of 1.955 AU, roughly twice that of planet b.

In 2022, at the same time Trifonov et al. confirmed the previous two planets, they also reported another smaller object, d, with a mass of 64 M_{🜨}, two-thirds that of Saturn (95 M_{🜨}). With a period of 89.9 days, an eccentricity of 0.191, and a semi-major axis of 0.452 AU, its orbit closely resembles that of Mercury, which has a period of 88.0 days, an eccentricity of 0.2056, and a semi-major axis of 0.3871 AU.

=== Stability and future ===
The HD 33142 system features massive planets in closely packed orbits, which makes it prone to orbital instability due to gravitational perturbations. While the system is presently stable, out of the 1,000 simulations conducted by Trifonov et al. with randomly generated initial conditions, one-third of them resulted in orbital destabilization within the million-year simulation span. For the unstable runs, the planetary system's median survival time was a mere 8,500 years.

Having left the main-sequence stage, HD 33142 is in the midst of developing into a red giant, and is expected to undergo two periods of rapid expansion in the next 300 million years: first during the red-giant branch, when it will reach a radius of ~0.75 AU; and then in the asymptotic giant branch, ballooning to around 1.45 AU; all before ceasing nucleosynthesis and shriveling up into a white dwarf. In both phases, tidal forces from the bloated star cause orbital decay. According to simulations, the two inner planets, d and b, will be engulfed by the star before the tip of the red-giant branch as their orbits contract. The outermost planet, c, is predicted to survive the red-giant branch and migrate outward to ~2.5 AU, but will ultimately either succumb to the same fate during the asymptotic giant branch, or be ejected from the system entirely.

The HD 33142 planetary system
Companion (in order from star)	Mass	Semimajor axis (AU)	Orbital period (days)	Eccentricity	Inclination (°)	Radius
d	≥0.20^{+0.02}_{−0.03} M_{J}	0.452 ± 0.003	89.9 ± 0.1	0.191^{+0.140}_{−0.128}	—	~0.832 R_{J}
b	≥1.26 ± 0.05 M_{J}	1.074 ± 0.007	330.0 ± 0.4	0.049^{+0.032}_{−0.030}	—	~1.22 R_{J}
c	≥0.89^{+0.06}_{−0.05} M_{J}	1.955^{+0.016}_{−0.012}	810.2^{+0.38}_{−0.42}	0.081^{+0.055}_{−0.047}	—	~1.24 R_{J}
