= HD 224693 b =

Extrasolar planet in the constellation Cetus

HD 224693 b / Xólotl
Discovery
- Discovered by: Johnson and NK2 consortium
- Discovery site: Hawaii, United States
- Discovery date: April 17, 2006; 20 years ago
- Detection method: Doppler Spectroscopy

Orbital characteristics
- Semi-major axis: 0.191±0.014 AU
- Eccentricity: 0.104±0.017
- Orbital period (sidereal): 26.6904±0.0019 d
- Time of periastron: 2463193.79±0.77
- Argument of periastron: 358±10
- Semi-amplitude: 39.96±0.68
- Star: HD 224693

HD 224693 b, formally named Xólotl, is an extrasolar planet orbiting the star HD 224693 every 27 days with a minimum mass 70% of Jupiter.

== Name ==
The name Xólotl for the planet HD 224693 b was selected in the NameExoWorlds campaign by Mexico, during the 100th anniversary of the IAU. Xólotl means animal in the native Nahuatl language and was an Aztec deity associated with the evening star (Venus).

== See also ==
- 79 Ceti b
- HD 33283 b
- HD 86081 b
