= HD 40235 =

Giant star in the constellation Lepus

Observation data Epoch J2000 Equinox ICRS
- Constellation: Lepus
- Right ascension: 05^{h} 56^{m} 34.4388^{s}
- Declination: −23° 12′ 55.121″
- Apparent magnitude (V): 6.37

Characteristics
- Spectral type: K0III
- B−V color index: 1.068±0.002

Astrometry
| Radial velocity (R_{v}) | −4.64±0.12 km/s |
| Proper motion (μ) | RA: +13.817 mas/yr Dec.: +29.448 mas/yr |
| Parallax (π) | 6.8612±0.0187 mas |
| Distance | 475 ± 1 ly (145.7 ± 0.4 pc) |
| Absolute magnitude (M_{V}) | +0.69 |

Details
| Mass | 1.51 M_{☉} |
| Radius | 11.6 R_{☉} |
| Luminosity | 60 L_{☉} |
| Surface gravity (log g) | 2.78±0.03 cgs |
| Temperature | 4,853±22 K |
| Metallicity [Fe/H] | −0.10±0.01 dex |

Other designations
- CD−23°3263, HD 40235, HIP 28118, HR 2090, TYC 6491-1059-1

Database references
| SIMBAD | data |

HD 40235 is a star in the constellation Lepus. At an apparent magnitude of 6.37, it is faintly visible to the naked eye in locations far from light pollution. Parallax measurements give a distance of 475 light-years (145.7 parsecs).

The spectrum of this star matches a spectral class of K0III, with the luminosity class III indicating it is a giant that has exhausted the hydrogen at its core. The star has a mass 1.51 times the mass of the Sun and has expanded to 11.6 times the Sun's radius. It now radiates 60 times the Sun's luminosity from its photosphere at an effective temperature of 4,853 K. This temperature give it the orange hue typical of a K-type star.
