= HD 32667 =

A-type star in the constellation Lepus

- Location of HD 32667 (circled)

Observation data Epoch J2000 Equinox ICRS
- Constellation: Lepus
- Right ascension: 05^{h} 03^{m} 53.27185^{s}
- Declination: −24° 23′ 17.3310″
- Apparent magnitude (V): 5.582

Characteristics
- Spectral type: (A2IV + unknown) + M
- B−V color index: +0.100

Astrometry
Radial velocity (R_{v})	27.770 ± 1.200 km/s
Proper motion (μ)	RA: 24.991 mas/yr Dec.: -37.918 mas/yr
Parallax (π)	16.9975±0.0397 mas
Distance	191.9 ± 0.4 ly (58.8 ± 0.1 pc)
Absolute magnitude (M_{V})	+1.79

Orbit
Primary	HD 32667 Aa
Name	HD 32667 Ab
Period (P)	~4 or ~46 d
Eccentricity (e)	unknown, possibly ~0.8

Orbit
Primary	HD 32667 A
Name	HD 32667 B
Semi-major axis (a)	0.5329±0.0013" (2808 AU)
Inclination (i)	71+24 −25°

Details

HD 32667 Aa
Mass	2.1164 ± 0.0040 M_{☉}
Surface gravity (log g)	4.1014 ± 0.0300 cgs
Temperature	9198 ± 92 K
Metallicity [Fe/H]	0.1853 ± 0.0300 dex
Rotational velocity (v sin i)	117.17 ± 2.48 km/s
Age	530+135 −140 Myr

HD 32667 Ab
Mass	≤1.44 M_{☉}

HD 32667 B
Mass	0.1053+0.0019 −0.0022 M_{☉}
Luminosity	0.000933+0.000067 −0.000062 L_{☉}

Other designations
- CD−24°2795, GC 6195, HD 32667, HIP 23554, HR 1645, SAO 170029, PPM 248396, TIC 13071322, TYC 6477-1294-1, GSC 06477-01294, 2MASS J05035326-2423174, Gaia DR3 2960561059245715968, Renson 8370, 10 G Leporis

Database references
SIMBAD	HD 32667

HD 32667 is a hierarchical triple star system located about 192 light-years (59 pc) away in the southern constellation of Lepus. The brightest of the three components, and the only one visible, is a hot white subgiant star. With an apparent magnitude of 5.582, it is faintly visible by the naked eye in dark skies. In Chinese astronomy, the star was given the name Jiǔ yóu zēng qī (Chinese: 九斿增七; lit. 'Nine flag addition seven'), meaning it was the seventh star added to the asterism Jiǔ yóu (九斿, "Imperial Military Flag") in the Net mansion, when the star chart Yixiang Kaocheng (仪象考成) was compiled between 1744 and 1752.

The star is listed in the Catalogue of Ap, HgMn and Am Stars as an A2-type Am star designated Renson 8370, although astronomer Dorrit Hoffleit suggested the contrary, classing it as an A3 weak-line star.

== Stellar companions ==
=== HD 32667 Ab ===
Radial velocity variations were reported as early as 1930, indicating the existence of an unresolved companion (HD 32667 Ab) orbiting close to the primary star. The 1991 edition of the Bright Star Catalogue lists HD 32667 (HR 1645) as a spectroscopic binary. However, this secondary star would remain hardly studied, with existing measurements being of "very bad" quality. In 2019, rough constraints were made on the nature of the secondary, namely that it does not weigh more than 1.44 M_{☉}, has either a highly eccentric (e~0.8) 46-day orbit or a 4-day orbit with an indeterminate eccentricity, and has a substantial magnitude difference with the brighter primary. Further research is needed to determine its precise characteristics.

=== HD 32667 B ===
A distant red dwarf companion revolving around the inner binary (Aa/Ab) was discovered in 2019 from data collected by the Gemini Planet Imager. The discovery paper described it as a 110.3 M_{J} (0.1053 M_{☉}) ultra-cool dwarf with a spectral type of M8, located at a separation of 0.533" from the inner binary. A 2023 study presented a semi-major axis of 2,808 AU (4.201×10^{11} km), a substantially higher mass of 0.21 M_{☉}, and a spectral type of M4V.
