= HD 86081 =

Star in the constellation Sextans

HD 86081 / Bibhā
Observation data Epoch J2000.0 Equinox J2000.0
- Constellation: Sextans
- Right ascension: 09^{h} 56^{m} 05.91846^{s}
- Declination: −03° 48′ 30.3259″
- Apparent magnitude (V): 8.73

Characteristics
- Evolutionary stage: subgiant
- Spectral type: G1V
- B−V color index: 0.664±0.026

Astrometry
Radial velocity (R_{v})	+30.80±0.19 km/s
Proper motion (μ)	RA: −66.939(19) mas/yr Dec.: +16.178(18) mas/yr
Parallax (π)	9.6783±0.0196 mas
Distance	337.0 ± 0.7 ly (103.3 ± 0.2 pc)
Absolute magnitude (M_{V})	3.86

Details

A
Mass	1.21±0.28 M_{☉}
Radius	1.57 R_{☉}
Luminosity	2.79 L_{☉}
Surface gravity (log g)	4.22 cgs
Temperature	5,963 K
Metallicity [Fe/H]	+0.22 dex
Rotational velocity (v sin i)	5.0 km/s
Age	3.61±0.86 Gyr

B
Mass	0.084±0.002 M_{☉}

Other designations
- Bibhā, BD−03 2815, HD 86081, HIP 48711, SAO 137236

Database references
SIMBAD	data
Exoplanet Archive	data

HD 86081 is a yellow-hued star in the equatorial constellation of Sextans. It has the proper name Bibhā, the Bengali form of a Sanskrit word meaning a bright beam of light. This name was suggested in the 2019 NameExoWorlds campaign.

With an apparent visual magnitude of 8.73, this star is too dim to be viewed with the naked eye but can be seen with a small telescope. It is located at a distance of approximately 340 light-years from the Sun based on parallax, and is drifting further away with a radial velocity of +31 km/s.

There is a low-mass companion star at a projected separation of 280±30 au.

== Characteristics ==
The stellar classification of this star is G1V, which indicates this is a G-type main-sequence star that, like the Sun, is generating energy through hydrogen fusion at its core. It is bigger and more massive than the Sun at 1.46 and 1.21 solar units respectively. The star is an estimated 3.6 billion years old and is spinning with a projected rotational velocity of 5 km/s. It is chromospherically inactive, with no emission seen in the core of the Ca II H and K lines. HD 86081 is radiating 2.8 times the luminosity of the Sun from its photosphere at an effective temperature of 5,963 K.

== Planetary system ==
Monitoring of this star for radial velocity variations began in November 2005 and the first companion was discovered on April 17, 2006. This hot Jupiter is orbiting just 5,180,000 km from the host star and has an orbital period of 2.1 days, one of the shortest periods ever discovered by this technique. The separation of this exoplanet is sufficiently low that it may have sped up the star's rotation through tidal interaction. HD 86081 shows no evidence of planetary transits in spite of a 17.6% transit probability. There is a linear trend in the star's radial velocity measurements that may be an indicator of additional unseen companions.

The HD 86081 planetary system
Companion (in order from star)	Mass	Semimajor axis (AU)	Orbital period (days)	Eccentricity	Inclination (°)	Radius
b / Santamasa	≥1.48±0.23 M_{J}	0.0346±0.0027	2.1378431±0.0000031	0.0119±0.0047	—	—

== See also ==
- HD 33283
- HD 224693
- List of extrasolar planets
