= Mira B =

Star in the constellation Cetus

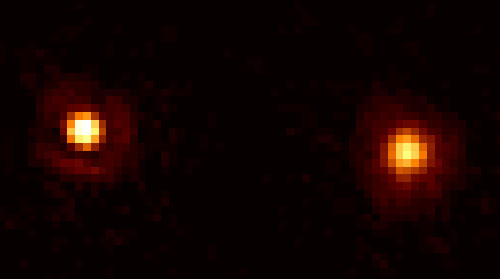
- The red giant star Mira (right), and its companion Mira B on the left. Taken on December 11, 1995, by the Hubble Space Telescope using the Faint Object Camera.

Observation data Epoch J2000 Equinox ICRS
- Constellation: Cetus
- Right ascension: 02^{h} 19^{m} 20.80^{s}
- Declination: −02° 58′ 40.0″
- Apparent magnitude (V): 9.5–12.0

Characteristics
- Evolutionary stage: white dwarf
- Spectral type: DA
- Variable type: unique

Astrometry
Distance	approx. 300 ly (approx. 90 pc)

Details
Mass	0.24±0.04 or 0.42±0.04 M_{☉}
Radius	0.015 or 0.020 R_{☉}
Temperature	14,000 K

Other designations
- VZ Cet, ο Cet B, WDS J02193-0259Ab, CCDM J02194-0258P, WD 0216-032

Database references
SIMBAD	data

Mira B (also known as VZ Ceti) is a white dwarf and the companion star to the variable star Mira. The two are separated by around 100 AU. Suspected as early as 1918, it was visually confirmed in 1923 by Robert Grant Aitken, and has been observed more or less continually since then, most recently by the Chandra X-Ray Observatory.

Long known to be erratically variable itself, its fluctuations seem to be related to its accretion of matter from Mira's stellar wind, which makes it a symbiotic star.

== Orbit ==
The exact orbit around Mira is poorly known due to its long period, though a commonly cited estimate of 497.9 years was published by Prieur et al in 2002. One 2018 study by Snaid et al. finds a reasonable fit with an orbital period of 945 years, an angular semi-major axis of 1.03" and a circular orbit. The distance in the Hipparcos catalog, together with the angular semi-major axis, give a physical semi-major axis of 95 AU.

== Physical properties ==
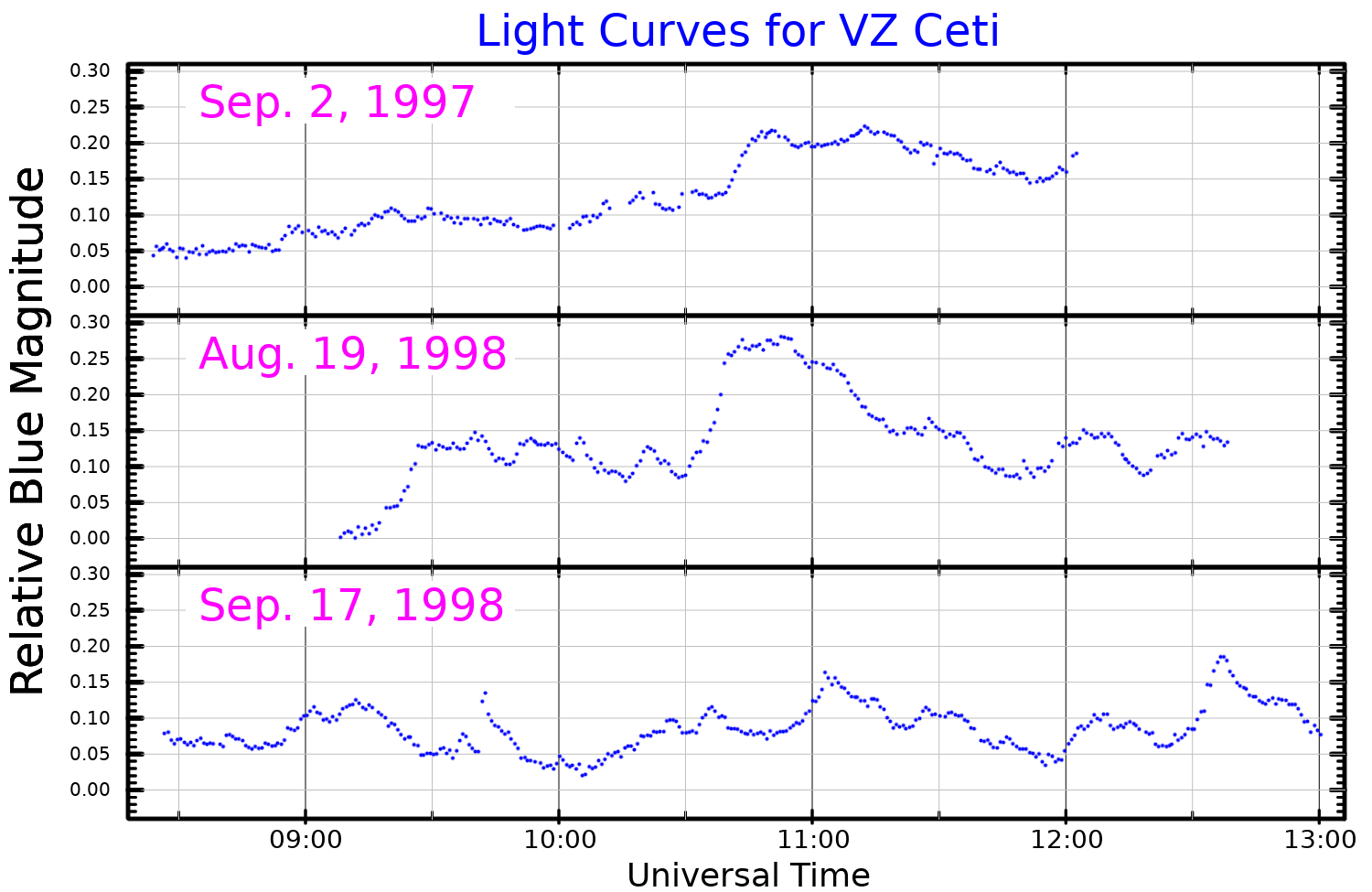
Blue band light curves for Mira B (VZ Ceti), adapted from Sokoloski and Bildsten (2010)

In January 2007, astronomers at the Keck Observatory announced the discovery of a protoplanetary disk around Mira B. Discovered via infrared data, the disk is apparently derived from captured material from Mira itself; Mira B accretes as much as one percent of the matter lost by its primary. Though planetary formation is perhaps unlikely as long as the disk is in active accretion, it may proceed apace once Mira A completes its red giant phase and becomes a white dwarf.

Mira B was long suspected to itself be a white dwarf. Several factors, such as its low x-ray luminosity, suggested that Mira B could instead be a normal main-sequence star of spectral type K and with a mass of roughly 0.7 M_{☉}. However, a 2010 analysis of rapid optical brightness variations indicated that Mira B is, in fact, a white dwarf. Although most white dwarfs have masses close to 0.6 M_{☉}, and Mira B has been assumed to have it too, measurements published in 2026, based on its accretion rate, suggest a mass of either 0.24±0.04 M_{☉} in the case of accretion through overflow of the red giant's Roche lobe by its stellar wind, or 0.42±0.04 M_{☉} in the case of Bondi–Hoyle–Lyttleton accretion. Mass-radius relations give radii of 0.020 or 0.015 R_{☉}, respectively. The case of wind roche lobe overflow is more probable, so Mira B is likely an extremely low-mass white dwarf.
