= HD 33283 =

Star in the constellation Lepus

Observation data Epoch J2000.0 Equinox J2000.0
- Constellation: Lepus
- Right ascension: 05^{h} 08^{m} 01.0123^{s}
- Declination: −26° 47′ 50.894″
- Apparent magnitude (V): 8.05

Characteristics
- Spectral type: G3/5V + M4–5
- B−V color index: 0.641±0.009

Astrometry
Radial velocity (R_{v})	+4.51±0.19 km/s
Proper motion (μ)	RA: 56.184 mas/yr Dec.: −46.058 mas/yr
Parallax (π)	11.0993±0.0286 mas
Distance	293.9 ± 0.8 ly (90.1 ± 0.2 pc)
Absolute magnitude (M_{V})	+3.19

Details

HD 33283
Mass	1.39±0.04 M_{☉} 1.24±0.1 M_{☉}
Radius	1.95±0.04 R_{☉} 1.20±0.1 R_{☉}
Luminosity	4.37±0.02 L_{☉}
Surface gravity (log g)	3.99±0.03 cgs
Temperature	5,985±57 K
Metallicity [Fe/H]	0.35±0.08 dex
Rotational velocity (v sin i)	1.09±0.26 km/s
Age	3.6±0.6 Gyr

HD 33283 B
Mass	0.17 M_{☉}

Other designations
- CD–26°2029, FK5 4470, Gaia DR2 2955981936912654592, GC 6286, HD 33283, HIP 23889, SAO 170100, PPM 75021, 2MASS J05080100-2647509

Database references
SIMBAD	data

HD 33283 is a star in the southern constellation Lepus with one planet and a co-moving stellar companion. With an apparent visual magnitude of 8.05, the star is too faint to be seen with the naked eye. It is located at a distance of 294 light years from the Sun based on parallax, and is drifting further away with a radial velocity of +4.5.

This is an ordinary G-type main-sequence star with a stellar classification of G3/5V. It is about 3.6 billion years old and is chromospherically inactive. The star is spinning slowly with a projected rotational velocity of 1 km/s and an estimated rotation period of about 55.5 days. It is larger and more massive than the Sun. HD 33283 is radiating over four times the luminosity of the Sun from its photosphere at an effective temperature of 5,985 K.

In 2014, a co-moving red dwarf companion star, HD 33283 B, of spectral class M4–M5 was detected at an angular separation of 55.7″, corresponding to a projected separation of 5,244 AU.

== Planetary system ==
In 2006, J. A. Johnson and associates found a jovian planet orbiting HD 33283 with the radial velocity method. It is orbiting at a distance of 0.15 AU (22 Gm) from the host star with a period of 18.2 days and an eccentricity (ovalness) of 0.4.

The HD 33283 planetary system
Companion (in order from star)	Mass	Semimajor axis (AU)	Orbital period (days)	Eccentricity	Inclination	Radius
b	≥0.329±0.071 M_{J}	0.1508±0.0087	18.1991±0.0017	0.399±0.056	—	—

== See also ==
- HD 33564
- HD 86081
- HD 224693
- List of extrasolar planets
