= HD 224693 =

Star in the constellation Cetus

HD 224693 / Axólotl
Observation data Epoch J2000.0 Equinox ICRS
- Constellation: Cetus
- Right ascension: 23^{h} 59^{m} 53.83172^{s}
- Declination: −22° 25′ 41.2163″
- Apparent magnitude (V): 8.23

Characteristics
- Evolutionary stage: subgiant
- Spectral type: G2V or G2IV
- B−V color index: 0.639±0.015
- Variable type: constant

Astrometry
Radial velocity (R_{v})	1.43±0.14 km/s
Proper motion (μ)	RA: 147.026 mas/yr Dec.: 26.865 mas/yr
Parallax (π)	10.5796±0.0279 mas
Distance	308.3 ± 0.8 ly (94.5 ± 0.2 pc)
Absolute magnitude (M_{V})	3.29

Details
Mass	1.29±0.09 M_{☉}
Radius	1.82+0.05 −0.04 R_{☉}
Luminosity	3.78±0.03 L_{☉}
Surface gravity (log g)	4.18±0.06 cgs
Temperature	5,971+55 −88 K
Metallicity [Fe/H]	0.28±0.02 dex
Rotational velocity (v sin i)	4.2 km/s
Age	3.0 Gyr

Other designations
- Axólotl, CD−23°18108, HD 224693, HIP 118319, SAO 192301

Database references
SIMBAD	data
Exoplanet Archive	data

HD 224693, also named Axólotl, is a star in the equatorial constellation of Cetus, and is positioned near the western constellation border with Aquarius. It can be viewed with a small telescope but is too faint to be seen with the naked eye, having an apparent visual magnitude of 8.23. Based on parallax measurements, the object is located at a distance of approximately 308 light-years from the Sun. It is drifting further away with a radial velocity of 1.4 km/s.

The star HD 224693 is named Axólotl. The name was selected in the NameExoWorlds campaign by Mexico, during the 100th anniversary of the IAU. "Axólotl" means "water animal" in the native Nahuatl language and an axolotl is also a species of salamander endemic to the valley of Mexico.

== Properties ==
HD 224693 is an ordinary G-type main-sequence star with a stellar classification of G2V. However, in 2006, Johnson and associates assigned it a class of G2 IV, suggesting it is instead an evolving subgiant star. It is about three billion years old and chromospherically quiet, with a projected rotational velocity of 4.2 km/s. The star is metal rich, showing a higher abundance of elements other than hydrogen and helium when compared to the Sun. It has 1.3 times the mass of the Sun and 1.8 times the Sun's radius. The star is radiating 3.78 times the luminosity of the Sun from its photosphere at an effective temperature of 5,971 K.

== Planetary system ==
In 2006, an extrasolar planet was discovered orbiting HD 224693 by the Keck telescope using radial velocity measurements. A preliminary search for transits using photometric data from Fairborn Observatory was inconclusive because data around the predicted time of transit was too sparse to rule out possible transits. This exoplanet was named Xolotl, after the Aztec god of fire and lightning.

The HD 224693 planetary system
Companion (in order from star)	Mass	Semimajor axis (AU)	Orbital period (days)	Eccentricity	Inclination (°)	Radius
b / Xólotl	≥0.7±0.12 M_{J}	0.191±0.014	26.6904±0.0019	0.104±0.017	—	—

== See also ==
- 79 Ceti
- HD 222582
- HD 33283
- HD 86081
- List of extrasolar planets
