= HD 34968 =

Binary star system in the constellation Lepus

- Location of HD 34968 (circled in red)

Observation data Epoch J2000 Equinox J2000
- Constellation: Lepus
- Right ascension: 05^{h} 20^{m} 26.91498^{s}
- Declination: −21° 14′ 23.1367″
- Apparent magnitude (V): 4.69 (4.73 + 8.45)

Characteristics
- Evolutionary stage: main sequence
- Spectral type: A0 V
- B−V color index: −0.048±0.003

Astrometry
Radial velocity (R_{v})	30.9±0.5 km/s
Proper motion (μ)	RA: +17.149 mas/yr Dec.: −9.382 mas/yr
Parallax (π)	8.7188±0.1661 mas
Distance	374 ± 7 ly (115 ± 2 pc)
Absolute magnitude (M_{V})	−0.82

Details

HD 34968 A
Mass	2.6 M_{☉}
Radius	4.4 R_{☉}
Luminosity	177 L_{☉}
Surface gravity (log g)	3.56 cgs
Temperature	10,046 K
Rotational velocity (v sin i)	84 km/s

Other designations
- BD−21°1135, HD 34968, HIP 24927, HR 1762, SAO 170327, WDS J05204-2114A

Database references
SIMBAD	data

HD 34968 is a binary star system in the southern constellation Lepus. The combined apparent visual magnitude of 4.69 is bright enough to be visible to the naked eye. The distance to HD 34968 can be estimated from its annual parallax shift of 8.7 mas, yielding a range of 374 light years. It is moving further away from the Earth with a heliocentric radial velocity of 31 km/s, having come within 118.6 ly some 3,686,000 years ago.

The primary member, component A, is a magnitude 4.73 star. Houk and Smith-Moore (1978) gave this object a stellar classification of A0 V, indicating it is an ordinary A-type main-sequence star. Gray and Garrison (1987) classified it as B9.5 III and noted that the spectrum is slightly variable. It is 99.2%±2.6% of the way through its main sequence lifetime, with 2.6 times the mass of the Sun and 4.4 times the Sun's radius. The star is spinning with a projected rotational velocity of 84 km/s. It is radiating 177 times the Sun's luminosity from its photosphere at an effective temperature of 10,046 K.

The fainter secondary, component B, is a magnitude 8.45 star at an angular separation of 4.1″ along a position angle of 279°, as of 2008.
