= HD 118203 =

Star in the constellation Ursa Major

HD 118203 / Liesma
Observation data Epoch J2000.0 Equinox ICRS
- Constellation: Ursa Major
- Right ascension: 13^{h} 34^{m} 02.5394^{s}
- Declination: +53° 43′ 42.698″
- Apparent magnitude (V): 8.06

Characteristics
- Evolutionary stage: subgiant
- Spectral type: G0V
- B−V color index: 0.699±0.012

Astrometry
Radial velocity (R_{v})	−29.37±0.13 km/s
Proper motion (μ)	RA: −85.849(18) mas/yr Dec.: −78.888(20) mas/yr
Parallax (π)	10.8643±0.0180 mas
Distance	300.2 ± 0.5 ly (92.0 ± 0.2 pc)
Absolute magnitude (M_{V})	3.32

Details
Mass	1.353±0.006 M_{☉}
Radius	1.993±0.065 R_{☉}
Luminosity	4.42±0.02 L_{☉}
Surface gravity (log g)	4.05±0.04 cgs
Temperature	5,872±20 K
Metallicity [Fe/H]	0.27±0.02 dex
Rotational velocity (v sin i)	7.0 km/s
Age	5.4±0.5 Gyr

Other designations
- Liesma, BD+54°1609, HD 118203, HIP 66192, SAO 28802, TOI-1271, TIC 286923464, TYC 3850-458-1

Database references
SIMBAD	The star
- planet b
Exoplanet Archive	data

HD 118203 is a star with an orbiting exoplanet located in the northern circumpolar constellation of Ursa Major. It has the proper name Liesma, which means flame, and it is the name of a character from the Latvian poem Staburags un Liesma (Staburags and Liesma). The name was selected in the NameExoWorlds campaign by Latvia, during the 100th anniversary of the IAU.

The apparent visual magnitude of HD 118203 is 8.06, which means it is invisible to the naked eye but it can be seen using binoculars or a telescope. Based on parallax measurements, it is located at a distance of 300 light years from the Sun. The star is drifting closer with a radial velocity of −29 km/s. Based on its position and space velocity this is most likely (97% chance) an older thin disk star. An exoplanet has been detected in a close orbit around the star.

The spectrum of HD 118203 matches a G-type main-sequence star with a class of G0V. Despite that spectral classification, it appears to have evolved away from the main sequence to become a subgiant. It has a low level of chromospheric activity, which means a low level of radial velocity jitter for planet detection purposes. The star has 1.23 times the mass of the Sun and double the Sun's radius. It is around 5.4 billion years old and is spinning with a projected rotational velocity of 7.0 km/s. HD 118203 is radiating 3.8 times the luminosity of the Sun from its photosphere at an effective temperature of 5,741 K.

== Planetary system ==
In 2006, a hot Jupiter, HD 118203 b, was reported in an eccentric orbit around this star. It was discovered using the radial velocity method based on observation of high-metallicity stars begun in 2004. In 2020, it was found that this is a transiting planet, which allowed the mass and radius of the body to be determined. This exoplanet has more than double the mass of Jupiter and is 13% greater in radius. The fact that the parent star is among the brighter known planet hosts (as of 2020) makes it an interesting object for further study. This planet received the proper name Staburags in the 2019 NameExoWorlds campaign.

In 2024, the star HD 118203 was found to display variability with a period matching that of planet b's orbit, suggesting magnetic interaction between the star and planet.

Also in 2024, a second massive planet was discovered using radial velocity observations as well as Hipparcos and Gaia astrometry. HD 118203 c is about 11 times the mass of Jupiter and takes 14 years to complete an orbit around the star. Like planet b, the orbit of planet c is close to edge-on, suggesting an aligned planetary system. The presence of any additional transiting planets at least twice the size of Earth and with periods less than 100 days was ruled out by the observations.

The HD 118203 planetary system
Companion (in order from star)	Mass	Semimajor axis (AU)	Orbital period (days)	Eccentricity	Inclination (°)	Radius
b / Staburags	2.182±0.033 M_{J}	0.0701±0.0004	6.1349890(13)	0.301±0.006	88.9+0.8 −1.0	1.12±0.09 R_{J}
c	11.25+0.57 −0.56 M_{J}	6.19±0.10	4,997+92 −99	0.261+0.028 −0.027	100.5+6.3 −7.4	—

== See also ==
- List of extrasolar planets
