= Mu Leporis =

Star in the constellation Lepus

μ Leporis
- Location of μ Leporis (circled)

Observation data Epoch J2000.0 Equinox ICRS
- Constellation: Lepus
- Right ascension: 05^{h} 12^{m} 55.90296^{s}
- Declination: −16° 12′ 19.6686″
- Apparent magnitude (V): 3.259

Characteristics
- Evolutionary stage: Main sequence
- Spectral type: B9 IV:HgMn
- U−B color index: −0.357
- B−V color index: −0.096
- Variable type: Suspected α^{2} CVn

Astrometry
Radial velocity (R_{v})	+27.7 km/s
Proper motion (μ)	RA: +45.702 mas/yr Dec.: −16.017 mas/yr
Parallax (π)	19.1775±0.3265 mas
Distance	170 ± 3 ly (52.1 ± 0.9 pc)
Absolute magnitude (M_{V})	−0.49

Details
Mass	3.7±0.4 M_{☉}
Radius	3.39±0.16 R_{☉}
Luminosity	251 L_{☉}
Surface gravity (log g)	3.77 cgs
Temperature	12,800 K
Metallicity [Fe/H]	+0.23 dex
Rotational velocity (v sin i)	16±0.5 km/s
Age	138±28 Myr

Other designations
- Bade, μ Lep, 5 Lep, BD−16°1072, FK5 1144, HD 33904, HIP 24305, HR 1702, SAO 150237

Database references
SIMBAD	data

Mu Leporis, Latinized from μ Leporis, formally named Bade, is a star in the southern constellation of Lepus. The apparent visual magnitude is 3.259, making the star visible to the naked eye at night from the southern hemisphere. Parallax measurements yield an estimated distance of 170 light-years (52 parsecs) from the Earth. It is moving further from the Sun with a radial velocity of +27.7 km/s.

The stellar classification of this star is B9 IV:HgMn, although the ':' indicates an uncertain spectral value. The luminosity class of IV would indicate that this is a subgiant that has exhausted the hydrogen at its core and it is in the process of evolving into a giant star. However, evolutionary models discount this, and find Mu Leporis is actually on the main sequence. At present it has about 3.4 times the Sun's radius, 3.7 times the mass of the Sun, and is radiating 251 times the Sun's luminosity from its photosphere at an effective temperature of 12,800 K.

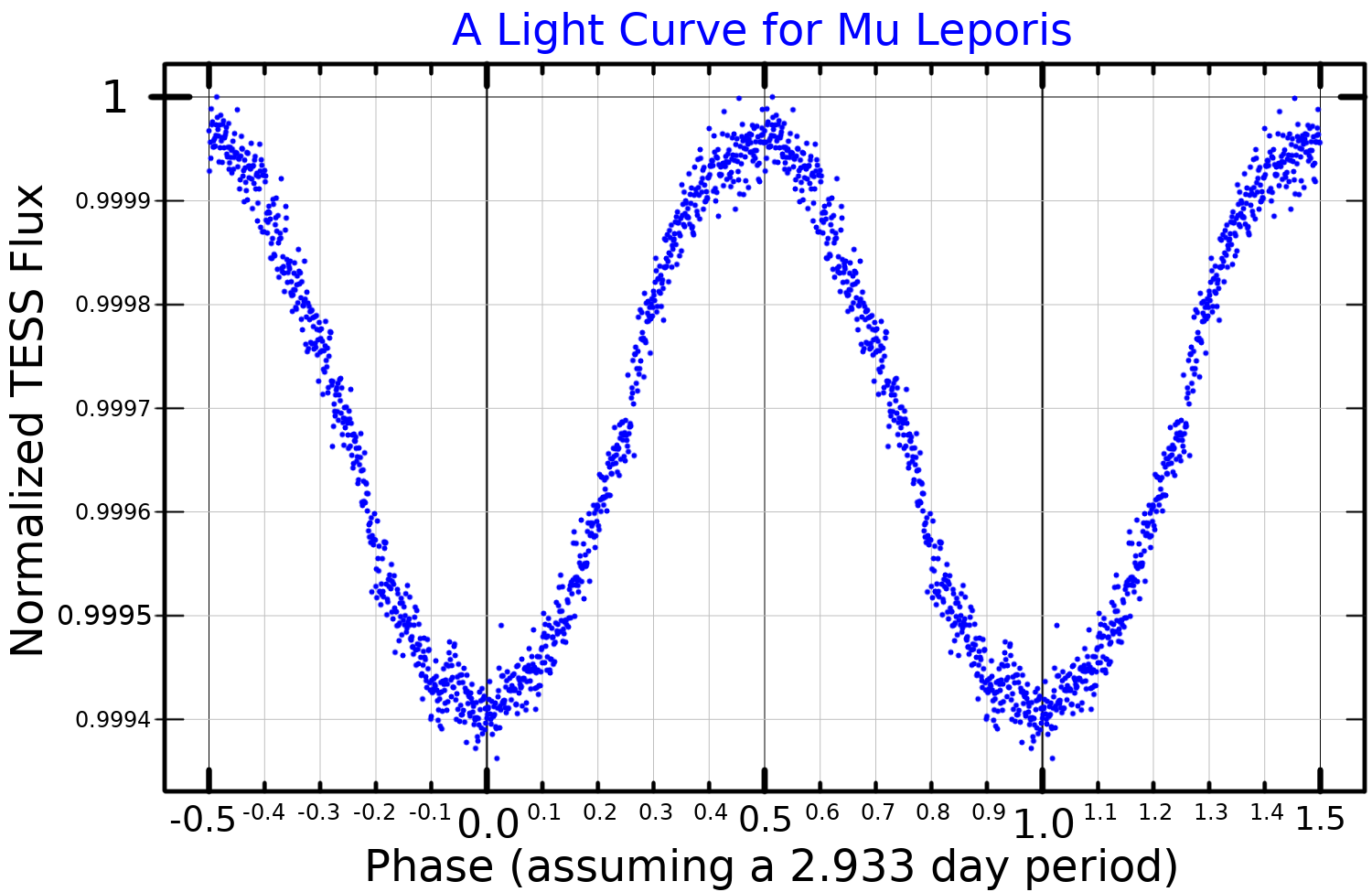
A light curve for Mu Leporis, plotted from TESS data

Mu Leporis is a suspected Alpha² Canum Venaticorum variable with a period of 2.933 days. The stellar spectrum of this star shows overabundances of mercury and manganese, as indicated by the HgMn in the stellar class. X-ray emission has been detected coming from a location at an angular separation of 0.93 arcseconds from this star. At the estimated distance of Mu Leporis, this equals a projected distance of 52 Astronomical Units. The source may be a stellar companion: either a star that has not yet reached the main sequence or a small, low-temperature star. The X-ray luminosity of this object is (4.4 ± 0.1) × 10 ^{29} erg s^{−1}.

== Nomenclature ==
Mu Leporis, Latinized from μ Leporis, is the star's Bayer designation.

In Bali (Indonesia), the constellation Lepus is known as Bade, a funeral tower used in the Ngaben cremation ceremony. The IAU Working Group on Star Names approved the name Bade for μ Leporis on 22 March 2026. In Chinese astronomy, μ Leporis forms with ε Leporis the asterism Ping (屏), representing a screen in front of a toilet.
