= TOI-421 =

Planetary system in the constellation Lepus

Observation data Epoch J2000 Equinox ICRS
- Constellation: Lepus
- Right ascension: 05^{h} 27^{m} 24.8259^{s}
- Declination: −14° 16′ 37.046″
- Apparent magnitude (V): 9.93

Characteristics
- Evolutionary stage: Main sequence
- Spectral type: G9V

Astrometry
Radial velocity (R_{v})	79.41±0.16 km/s
Proper motion (μ)	RA: −35.743(11) mas/yr Dec.: 50.387(11) mas/yr
Parallax (π)	13.3337±0.0117 mas
Distance	244.6 ± 0.2 ly (75.00 ± 0.07 pc)

Details
Mass	0.833+0.048 −0.054 M_{☉}
Radius	0.866±0.006 R_{☉}
Surface gravity (log g)	4.48±0.03 cgs
Temperature	5291±64 K
Metallicity [Fe/H]	−0.044±0.04 dex
Rotation	39.6±1.6 d
Rotational velocity (v sin i)	1.8±1.0 km/s
Age	10.9+2.9 −5.2 Gyr

Other designations
- BD−14 1137, PPM 711571, TOI-421, TIC 94986319, TYC 5344-1206-1, GSC 05344-01206, 2MASS J05272482-1416370, Gaia DR2 2984582227215748864, Gaia DR3 2984582227215748864

Database references
SIMBAD	data
Exoplanet Archive	data

TOI-421 (also known as BD−14 1137) is a G-type main-sequence star located in the constellation Lepus. The star hosts two transiting exoplanets discovered in 2020 and forms a visual binary system with a nearby red dwarf star BD−14 1137 B. Both planets are hot Neptunes well-suited for atmospheric characterization. Due to the star's old age, knowing the composition of their atmosphere can provide valuable insights for validation of atmospheric evolution models.

== Stellar characteristics ==
TOI-421 is a Solar-type star, of similar metallicity though somewhat smaller the Sun. According to the evolutionary models, it is thought to be an old star, age of approximately 10 billion years. Observations of variability related to its ~42-day rotation indicate a low level of stellar activity with only few surface spots, dominated by plages.

The red dwarf companion is positioned 29.4″ NW, corresponding to actual separation of approximately 2200 AU.

== Planetary system ==
A discovery of two planets transiting the star was announced in 2020, based on TESS observations between 15 November 2018 and 7 January 2019, and confirmed with ground-based observations. The TESS light curve features two series of transit signals identified with the two planets; a deeper one every ~16.1 days and a shallower one every ~5.2 days.

The orbital parameters were refined in a 2024 study that included additional transit observations by TESS and CHEOPS as well as radial velocity measurements for determination of mass of the planets, showing that both planets have moderately eccentric orbits. The study did not find evidence of transit-timing variations, which could hint at existence of additional non-transiting planets.

The TOI-421 planetary system
Companion (in order from star)	Mass	Semimajor axis (AU)	Orbital period (days)	Eccentricity	Inclination (°)	Radius
b	6.7±0.6 M_{🜨}	0.0554±0.0010	5.197576±0.000005	0.13±0.05	85.68+0.36 −0.46	2.64±0.08 R_{🜨}
c	14.1±1.4 M_{🜨}	0.1170±0.0018	16.067541±0.000004	0.19±0.04	88.353+0.078 −0.084	5.09±0.07 R_{🜨}

=== TOI-421 b ===
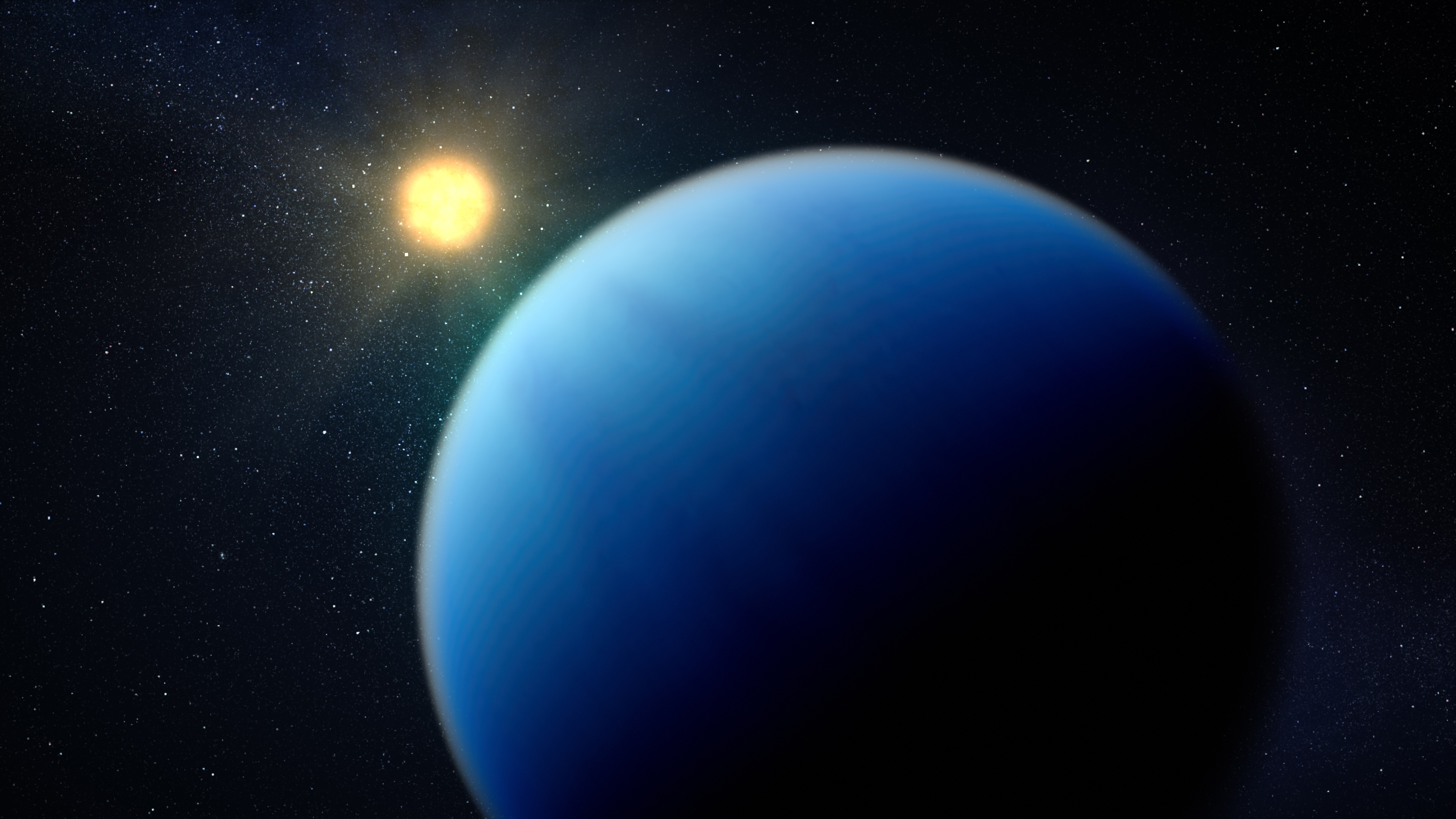
An artist’s concept of TOI-421 b, a sub-Neptune.

The planet b is a hot mini-Neptune with a moderate density of 0.37±0.05 ρ_{🜨} (2.04±0.28 g⋅cm^{−3}) (Note: Density converted from ρ_{🜨} to g⋅cm^{−3} by using the value for Earth density ρ_{🜨} = 5.513 g⋅cm^{−3}.) and an equilibrium temperature of 922±14 K. Due to its high equilibrium temperature and small mass it is expected to experience significant atmospheric escape. However, the observed density is not consistent with a thin, hydrogen-depleted atmosphere expected from evolutionary models for a planet forming this close to the star. Planetary migration is a plausible explanation, meaning that the planet could have formed further away from the star and only more recently moved to current location.

TOI-421 b was selected as a James Webb Space Telescope target early on as a planet similar in size and density to the well-studied sub-Neptune GJ 1214 b, but thought to be too hot for formation of atmospheric haze, which would allow for bulk chemical characterization of atmosphere. In 2025 it became the first sub-Neptune around a solar-type star to have its atmosphere characterized with JWST. The observed infrared spectrum is consistent with a hydrogen/helium dominated atmosphere and detected presence of water at abundances of 10^{−3}‍–‍10^{−4} and hints of sulfur dioxide and carbon monoxide, but no carbon dioxide or methane. The observed spectrum also excludes the possibility of presence of high-altitude haze. This is in contrast to the observed composition of sub-Neptunes around red dwarf stars, which typically show a much higher fraction of heavier gas species.

=== TOI-421 c ===
The planet c is a hot Neptune with a low density of 0.107±0.012 ρ_{🜨} (0.590±0.066 g⋅cm^{−3}), belonging to the super-puff class. Its equilibrium temperature is 635±9 K. Like the planet b, it is also expected to exhibit significant atmospheric escape. However, the low density implies that the planet has retained an extensive atmosphere.

== See also ==
- HD 152843
- K2-24
