= 17 Leporis =

Star in the constellation Lepus

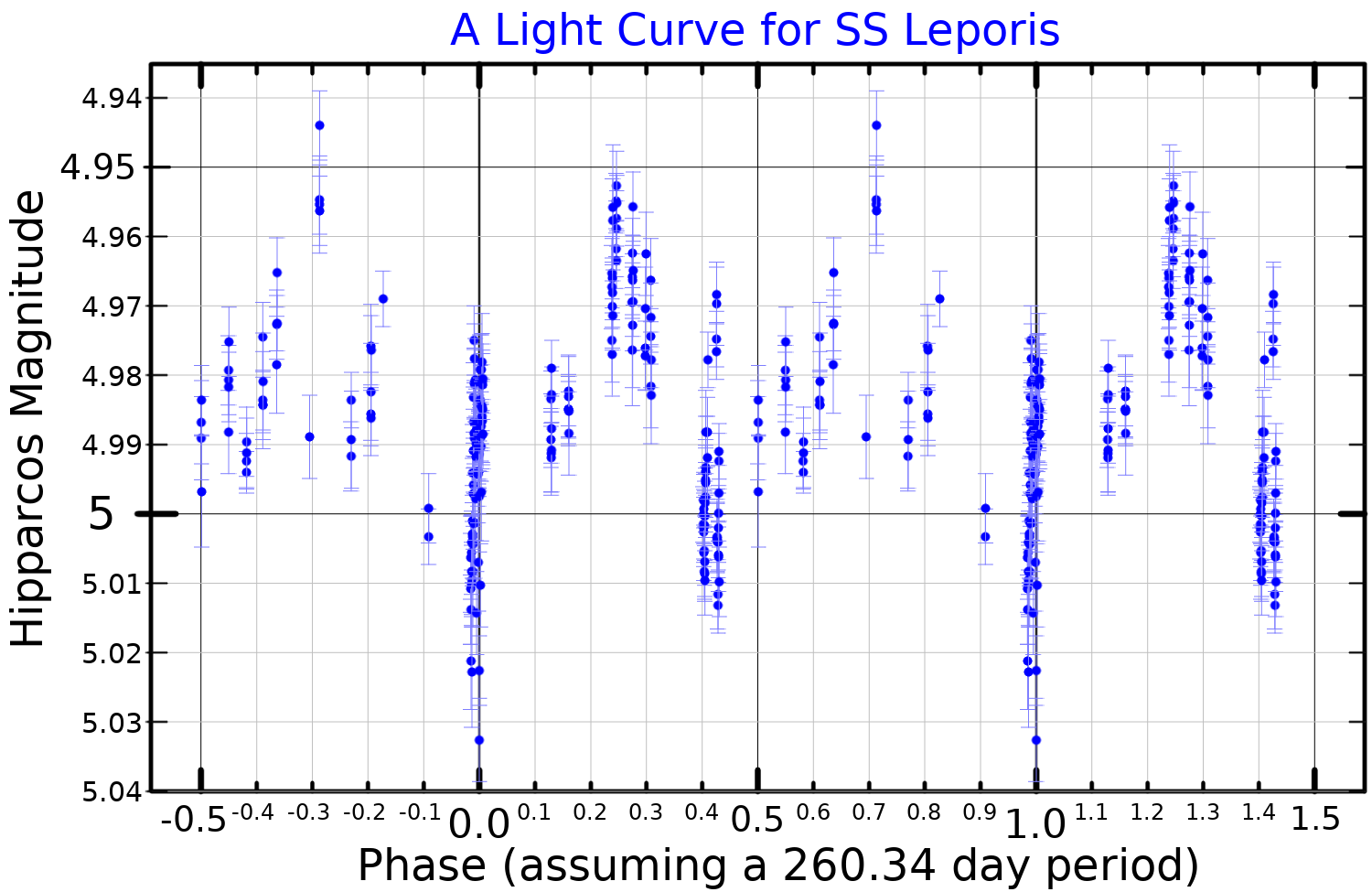
- A light curve for SS Leporis, plotted from Hipparcos data

Observation data Epoch J2000.0 Equinox J2000.0 (ICRS)
- Constellation: Lepus
- Right ascension: 06^{h} 04^{m} 59.12945^{s}
- Declination: −16° 29′ 03.9692″
- Apparent magnitude (V): 4.82 to 5.06

Characteristics
- Spectral type: A1V + M6III
- U−B color index: +0.12 (combined)
- B−V color index: +0.24 (combined)
- R−I color index: +0.52 (combined)
- Variable type: Z And

Astrometry
Radial velocity (R_{v})	+18.74±0.10 (center of mass) km/s
Proper motion (μ)	RA: −5.955 mas/yr Dec.: −3.680 mas/yr
Parallax (π)	3.5742±0.0992 mas
Distance	910 ± 30 ly (280 ± 8 pc)

Orbit
Period (P)	260.34±1.80 d
Semi-major axis (a)	4.492±0.014 mas
Eccentricity (e)	0.005±0.003
Inclination (i)	143.7±0.5°
Longitude of the node (Ω)	162.2±0.7°
Periastron epoch (T)	2,448,528.78±0.37 HJD
Argument of periastron (ω) (secondary)	203.7±0.4°
Semi-amplitude (K_{1}) (primary)	6.1±1.0 km/s
Semi-amplitude (K_{2}) (secondary)	21.32±0.21 km/s

Details

A-type star
Mass	2.71±0.27 M_{☉}
Radius	18 R_{☉}
Luminosity	1,900 L_{☉}
Surface gravity (log g)	2.0 cgs
Temperature	9,000 K

M giant
Mass	1.30±0.33 M_{☉}
Radius	66.7±3.3 R_{☉}
Luminosity	1,200 L_{☉}
Surface gravity (log g)	1.0 cgs
Temperature	3,250 K

Other designations
- 17 Lep, SS Lep, BD−16°1349, HD 41511, HIP 28816, HR 2148, SAO 151093

Database references
SIMBAD	data

17 Leporis is a binary star system in the southern constellation of Lepus. It has an overall apparent visual magnitude which varies between 4.82 and 5.06, making it luminous enough to be visible to the naked eye as a faint star. The variable star designation for this system is SS Leporis, while 17 Leporis is the Flamsteed designation. Parallax measurements yield a distance estimate of around 910 light years from the Sun. The system is moving further away from the Earth with a heliocentric radial velocity of +18.7 km/s.

This is a double-lined spectroscopic binary system with an orbital period of 260 days and an eccentricity of 0.005. The spectrum reveals the pair to consist of an A-type main-sequence star with a stellar classification of A1 V, and a red giant with a class of M6III. The close pair form a symbiotic binary with ongoing mass transfer from the giant to the hotter component. The giant does not appear to be filling its Roche lobe, so the mass transfer is coming from stellar wind off the giant. The pair are surrounded by a shell and a dusty circumbinary disk, with the former obliterating the lines from the A-type star.

== Gallery ==
This zoom sequence starts with a broad view of the spectacular Milky Way. It then closes in on the small constellation of Lepus (The Hare) and finally focuses on 17 Lep.

Wide field around SS Leporis. The field of view is approximately 2.7 degrees.
