= HD 165634 =

Star in the constellation Sagittarius

- Location of HD 165634 (circled)

Observation data Epoch J2000 Equinox ICRS
- Constellation: Sagittarius
- Right ascension: 18^{h} 08^{m} 04.97982^{s}
- Declination: −28° 27′ 25.5316″
- Apparent magnitude (V): 4.56

Characteristics
- Spectral type: G7:IIIb CN−1 CH−3.5 HK+1
- U−B color index: +0.75
- B−V color index: +0.95

Astrometry
Radial velocity (R_{v})	−4.87 km/s
Proper motion (μ)	RA: +25.43 mas/yr Dec.: −31.18 mas/yr
Parallax (π)	9.62±0.26 mas
Distance	339 ± 9 ly (104 ± 3 pc)
Absolute magnitude (M_{V})	−0.53

Details
Mass	3.38 M_{☉}
Radius	16.98 R_{☉}
Luminosity	168 L_{☉}
Surface gravity (log g)	2.51 cgs
Temperature	5,043 K
Metallicity [Fe/H]	−0.05 dex
Rotational velocity (v sin i)	2.6 km/s

Other designations
- CD−28°14174, FK5 3439, GC 24694, HD 165634, HIP 88839, HR 6766, SAO 186328, GSC 06854-04372

Database references
SIMBAD	data

HD 165634 is a star in the southern constellation of Sagittarius. It has a yellow hue and is faintly visible to the naked eye with apparent visual magnitude of 4.56. The star is located at a distance of approximately 339 light years from the Sun based on parallax, but is drifting closer with a radial velocity of −5 km/s. It has an absolute magnitude of −0.53.

This is a CH-peculiar giant star with a stellar classification of G7:IIIbCN-1CH-3.5HK+1, and has been designated as a standard example of this spectral type. This notation indicates a G-type giant (G7:IIIb) with underabundances of CN and CH molecules. It is a rare "weak G–band star", showing an abnormally weak G band of the molecule CN. This indicates an underabundance of carbon in the stellar atmosphere; the abundances of most other elements are otherwise normal for a star at its evolutionary stage. The depletion of carbon is a reflection of internal processes while the star is on the red giant branch, accompanied by deep mixing.

In 2000, Böhm-Vitense and collaborators suggested that the star has an evolved white dwarf companion. This object can explain an excess flux of ultraviolet radiation, and a mass-transfer could be the source for a mild nitrogen excess on the visible component. The progenitor star was not very evolved because there is no excess of s-process elements such as barium. It may even have been a low-mass star that lost its envelope.
