= SZ Piscium =

Star system in the constellation Pisces

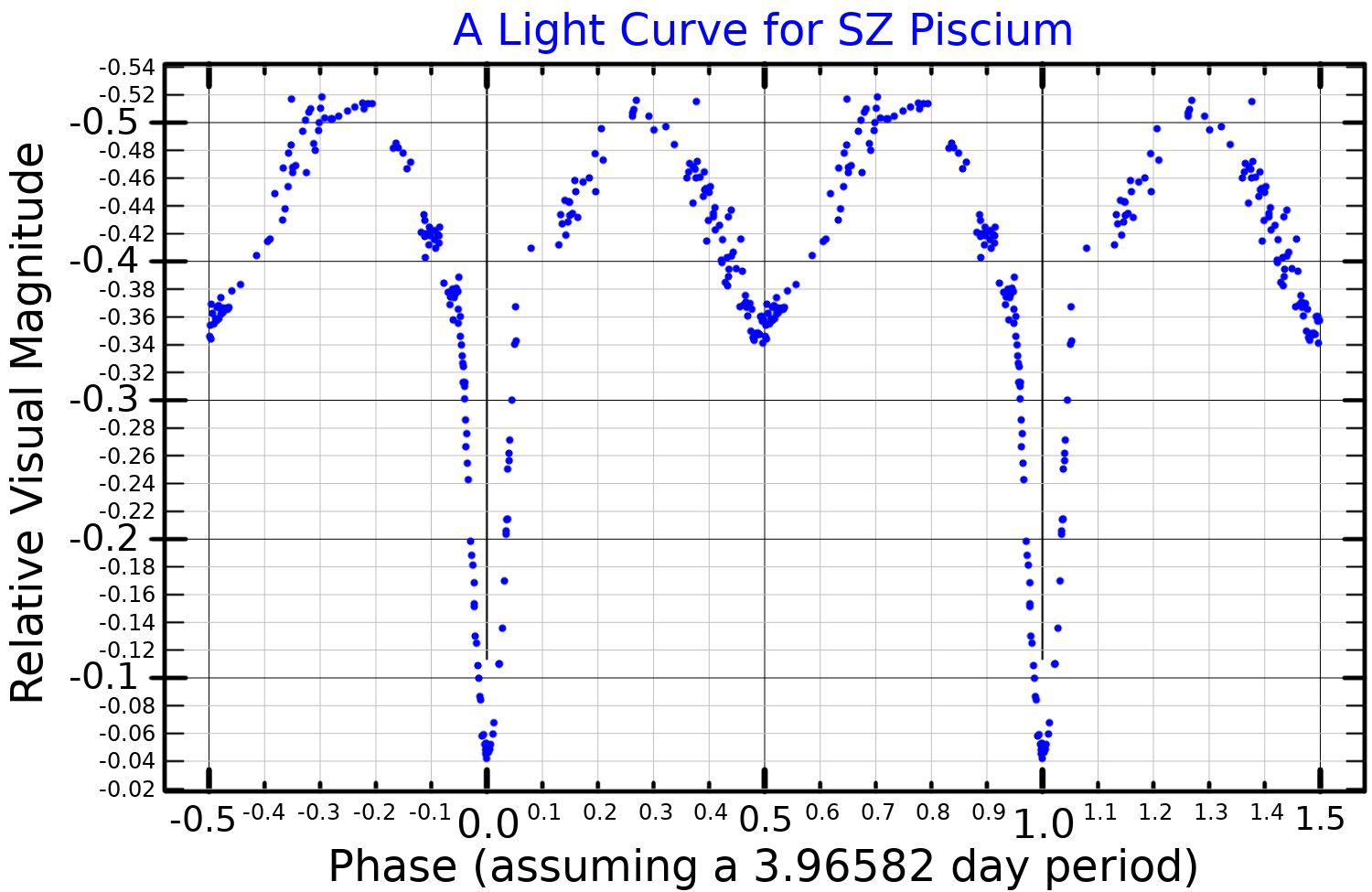
- A visual band light curve for SZ Piscium, adapted from Eaton et al. (1982)

Observation data Epoch J2000.0 Equinox ICRS
- Constellation: Pisces
- Right ascension: 23^{h} 13^{m} 23.778^{s}
- Declination: +02° 40′ 31.60″
- Apparent magnitude (V): 7.18

Characteristics
- Spectral type: K1IV + F8V + ?
- Variable type: EA/DS/RS

Astrometry
Radial velocity (R_{v})	12.00±2 km/s
Proper motion (μ)	RA: 23.624 mas/yr Dec.: 26.346 mas/yr
Parallax (π)	10.6705±0.1864 mas
Distance	306 ± 5 ly (94 ± 2 pc)

Orbit
Primary	Primary
Secondary	Secondary
Period (P)	3.96566356 d
Semi-major axis (a)	15.2 R_{☉}
Eccentricity (e)	0 (fixed)
Inclination (i)	69.75°
Semi-amplitude (K_{1}) (primary)	74.2 km/s
Semi-amplitude (K_{2}) (secondary)	103.98 km/s

Orbit
Primary	Inner pair
Secondary	Tertiary
Period (P)	1,530±3 d
Eccentricity (e)	0.325±0.013
Periastron epoch (T)	2,452,235±13 HJD
Argument of periastron (ω) (secondary)	3.0±1.7°
Semi-amplitude (K_{1}) (primary)	6.2±0.3 km/s
Semi-amplitude (K_{2}) (secondary)	25.3±0.8 km/s

Details

Primary
Mass	1.74 M_{☉}
Radius	6.0 R_{☉}
Luminosity	12.3 L_{☉}
Temperature	4,910 K
Rotational velocity (v sin i)	3.0±0.6 km/s

Secondary
Mass	1.33 M_{☉}
Radius	1.52 R_{☉}
Luminosity	3.98 L_{☉}
Temperature	6,090 K
Rotational velocity (v sin i)	67.7±1.0 km/s

Other designations
- SZ Psc, AG+02 2918, BD+01 4695, HD 219113, HIP 114639, SAO 128041, PPM 173881, WDS 23134+0241

Database references
SIMBAD	data

SZ Piscium is a triple star system in the equatorial constellation of Pisces. The inner pair form a double-lined spectroscopic binary with an orbital period of 3.966 days. It is a detached Algol-type eclipsing binary of the RS Canum Venaticorum class with a subgiant component. (This means the pair have a close but separated orbit with the stars eclipsing one another, and the primary component is an evolving star showing star spots and other magnetic activity.) The system is too faint to be readily visible to the naked eye with a combined apparent visual magnitude of 7.18. It is located at a distance of approximately 306 light years based on parallax measurements.

The variability of this star was reported by A. Jensch in 1934, who published the first elements. In 1956 the spectrum of the system was examined by N. G. Roman, who found the cooler component is the brighter and more evolved. The system was studied by G. A. Bakos and J. F. Heard in 1958, who found a magnitude of 7.72 for the primary eclipse minimum and 7.30 for the secondary. They refined the class estimates, finding the primary is probably a K1IV subgiant in close orbit with an F8V main sequence star. In 1972, H. L. Atkins and D. S. Hall included it on a list of RS Canum Venaticorum type variable systems and showed it has an infrared excess.

S. Jakate and associates in 1976 found that the period of luminosity variation is changing over time. They discovered strong emission in the H and K lines of the K star and noted that it showed intrinsic variability. The system displayed unusual episodes of emission and variation in the Hα line, which was interpreted by astronomers as ejected material possibly forming a transient disk. The orbital period of the system varies in a 56 year cycle with an amplitude of 4.3×10^{−4} d, which may be explained by influences of the stellar wind and magnetic activity.

Significant star spot activity was found all over the K-type star, with variations in the total spot coverage observed over time. It is estimated to be filling 85% of its Roche lobe due to the gravitational influence of the secondary. The rotation period of this star is several times slower than its orbital period, while the rotation of the F-type star is synchronous. Changes in radial velocity of the system over time suggest it is a triple star system with the tertiary component having about 75% of the mass of the Sun and an orbital period of 1,530±3 days.
