= Theta Leporis =

Star in the constellation Lepus

- Location of θ Leporis (circled in red)

Observation data Epoch J2000.0 Equinox J2000.0 (ICRS)
- Constellation: Lepus
- Right ascension: 06^{h} 06^{m} 09.32339^{s}
- Declination: −14° 56′ 06.9188″
- Apparent magnitude (V): 4.67

Characteristics
- Spectral type: A0 V
- U−B color index: +0.00
- B−V color index: +0.05

Astrometry
| Radial velocity (R_{v}) | +32.0 km/s |
| Proper motion (μ) | RA: -17.61 mas/yr Dec.: +12.79 mas/yr |
| Parallax (π) | 18.88±0.54 mas |
| Distance | 173 ± 5 ly (53 ± 2 pc) |
| Absolute magnitude (M_{V}) | +1.05 |

Details
| Mass | 2.35±0.03 M_{☉} |
| Luminosity | 41 L_{☉} |
| Surface gravity (log g) | 4.12 cgs |
| Temperature | 10,453±355 K |
| Rotational velocity (v sin i) | 246 km/s |
| Age | 207 Myr |

Other designations
- θ Lep, 18 Lep, BD−14°1331, FK5 2466, GC 7742, HD 41695, HIP 28910, HR 2155, SAO 151110

Database references
| SIMBAD | data |

Theta Leporis, Latinized from θ Leporis, is a solitary, white-hued star in the southern constellation of Lepus. It has an apparent visual magnitude of 4.67, making it bright enough to be viewed with the naked eye. Based upon an annual parallax shift of 18.88 mas as measured from Earth, the system is located roughly 173 light years from the Sun. The star made its closest approach about 1.6 million years ago when it came within 29 ly (9.0 pc) of the Sun.

This is an ordinary A-type main-sequence star with a stellar classification of A0 V and an age of about 207 million years. It is rotating rapidly with a projected rotational velocity of 207 km/s. This is giving the star an oblate shape with an equatorial bulge that is an estimated 10% larger than the polar radius. It has an estimated 2.35 times the mass of the Sun and is radiating 41 times the Sun's luminosity from its photosphere at an effective temperature of around 10,453 K.
