= HD 118203 b =

Exoplanet in Ursa Major

HD 118203 b / Staburags
Discovery
- Discovered by: Da Silva et al.
- Discovery site: Haute-Provence Observatory, France
- Discovery date: 22 August 2005
- Detection method: Doppler spectroscopy (ELODIE)

Orbital characteristics
- Apastron: 0.092 AU (13,800,000 km)
- Periastron: 0.048 AU (7,200,000 km)
- Semi-major axis: 0.07082 AU (10,595,000 km)
- Eccentricity: 0.316±0.021
- Orbital period (sidereal): 6.134980+0.000038 −0.000037 d
- Average orbital speed: 120
- Inclination: 88.75+0.86 −1.0
- Time of periastron: 2458707.116+0.048 −0.045
- Argument of periastron: 153.6+3.5 −3.6
- Semi-amplitude: 218.3+5.2 −5.1
- Star: HD 118203

Physical characteristics
- Mean radius: 1.133+0.031 −0.030 R_{J}
- Mass: 2.173+0.077 −0.080 M_{J}
- Mean density: 1.85 ± 0.13 g/cm^{3} g cm^{−3}
- Temperature: 1,496 ± 26 K (1,222.8 ± 26.0 °C; 2,233.1 ± 46.8 °F) (equilibrium)

HD 118203 b, formally named Staburags, is a jovian planet that takes only 6.13 days or 147 hours to orbit the parent star HD 118203 at a distance of 0.07 astronomical units. The exact mass was not known since inclination was not known until TESS detected the planet. This hot Jupiter is unusual since it has relatively high eccentricity of 0.31.

The planet HD 118203 b is named Staburags. The name was selected in the NameExoWorlds campaign by Latvia, during the 100th anniversary of the IAU. Staburags is the name of a character from the Latvian poem Staburags un Liesma, and denotes a rock with symbolic meaning in literature and history.

HD 118203 b was discovered in August 2005 in Haute-Provence Observatory in France by Da Silva who used the doppler spectroscopy to look for shifts in the star's spectrum caused by the planet's gravity as the planet orbits the star.

In 2019 the transits of the planet were detected with the Transiting Exoplanet Survey Satellite. The host star is one of the brightest stars for transiting planets and HD 118203 b is therefore a good target for follow-up observations.
