= HD 86081 b =

Extrasolar planet in the constellation Sextans

Santamasa
Discovery
- Discovered by: Johnson et al.
- Discovery site: California
- Discovery date: April 17, 2006
- Detection method: radial velocity (N2K Consortium)

Orbital characteristics
- Semi-major axis: 0.0346±0.0027 AU
- Eccentricity: 0.0119±0.0047
- Orbital period (sidereal): 2.1378431±0.0000031 d
- Time of periastron: 2463695.46±0.14
- Argument of periastron: 3±23
- Semi-amplitude: 205.53±0.78
- Star: HD 86081

HD 86081 b or Santamasa, meaning 'clouded' in Sanskrit, is a gas giant exoplanet that orbits close to its host star HD 86081 or Bibha, completing its orbit in only 2.1375 days. With such a short orbit it belongs to the class of exoplanets known as hot Jupiters. Like most Hot Jupiters, the orbit is nearly circular, with an eccentricity of 0.008.
