= R Leporis =

Star in the constellation Lepus

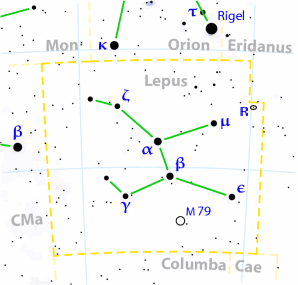
- Location of R Leporis in the constellation Lepus.

Observation data Epoch J2000.0 Equinox J2000.0 (ICRS)
- Constellation: Lepus
- Right ascension: 04^{h} 59^{m} 36.3487^{s}
- Declination: −14° 48′ 22.518″
- Apparent magnitude (V): 5.5 to 11.7

Characteristics
- Evolutionary stage: AGB
- Spectral type: C7,6e(N6e)
- B−V color index: +5.74
- R−I color index: +1.47
- Variable type: Mira

Astrometry
Radial velocity (R_{v})	32.4 ± 2 km/s
Proper motion (μ)	RA: 6.798 mas/yr Dec.: −1.263 mas/yr
Parallax (π)	2.1914±0.0602 mas
Distance	1,490 ± 40 ly (460 ± 10 pc)

Details
Mass	1.00 – 1.49 M_{☉}
Radius	710 – 910 (Note: Calculated via the equation R = 0.1075 • 𝜃 • d, where R is the radius (in solar radii/R_{☉}), 𝜃 is the angular diameter in arcseconds and d is the distance in parsecs. Angular diameters of 14 to 18 milliarcseconds (0.014-0.018 arcseconds) and a distance of 471 parsecs were adopted.) R_{☉}
Luminosity	13,200 L_{☉}
Surface gravity (log g)	−0.40 cgs
Temperature	2,290 K
Metallicity [Fe/H]	+0.5 dex

Other designations
- R Lep, AAVSO 0455-14, BD−15 915, GC 6093, HD 31996, HIP 23203, HR 1607, SAO 150058, PPM 215123, IRC −10080

Database references
SIMBAD	data

R Leporis (R Lep), sometimes called Hind's Crimson Star, is a well-known variable star in the constellation Lepus, near its border with Eridanus.

It is a carbon star which appears distinctly red. It is named after famous British astronomer J. R. Hind, who observed it in 1845. Its apparent magnitude varies from +5.5 to +11.7 with a period of 418–441 days; recent measurements give a period of 427.07 days. There may be a secondary period of 40 years. Guandalini and Cristallo calculated the luminosity of Mira variables based on their periods. Using a period of 427.07 days, they calculated the bolometric luminosity to be 13,200 L_{☉}.

R Leporis has often been reported as having an intense smoky red color, although this is not pronounced when the star is near its maximum brightness. It is reddest when it is dimmest, which occurs every 14.5 months. During these periods it is a candidate for the most-visible reddest star, but this claim is questionable. The red coloration may be caused by carbon in the star's outer atmosphere filtering out the blue part of its visible light spectrum. The star's discoverer, Hind, reported that it appeared "like a drop of blood on a black field."

R Leporis as imaged by ALMA

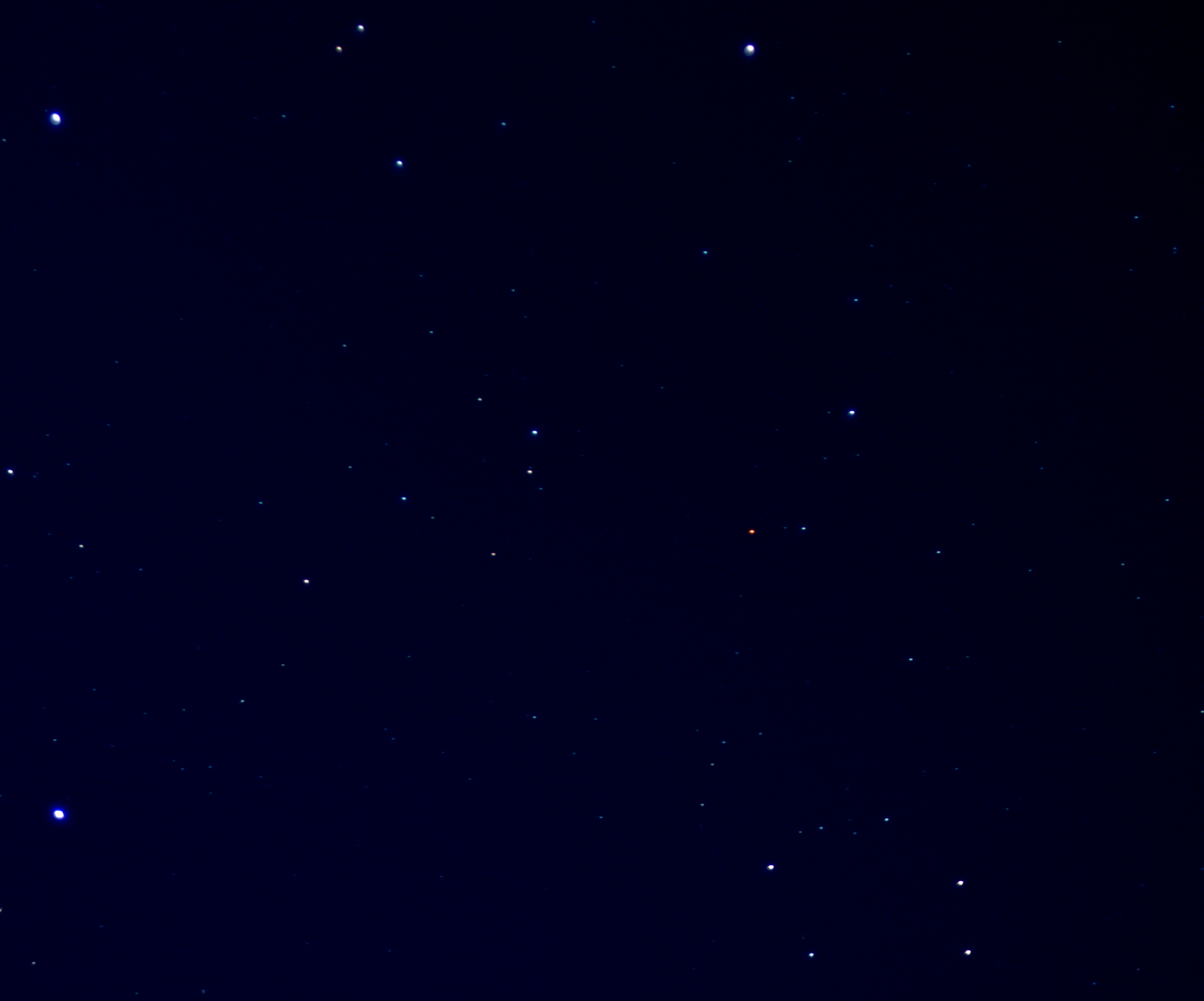
An image of the carbon star R Leporis as seen in binoculars. R Leporis is the red star right of centre. The bright star in the lower left corner is Mu Leporis.

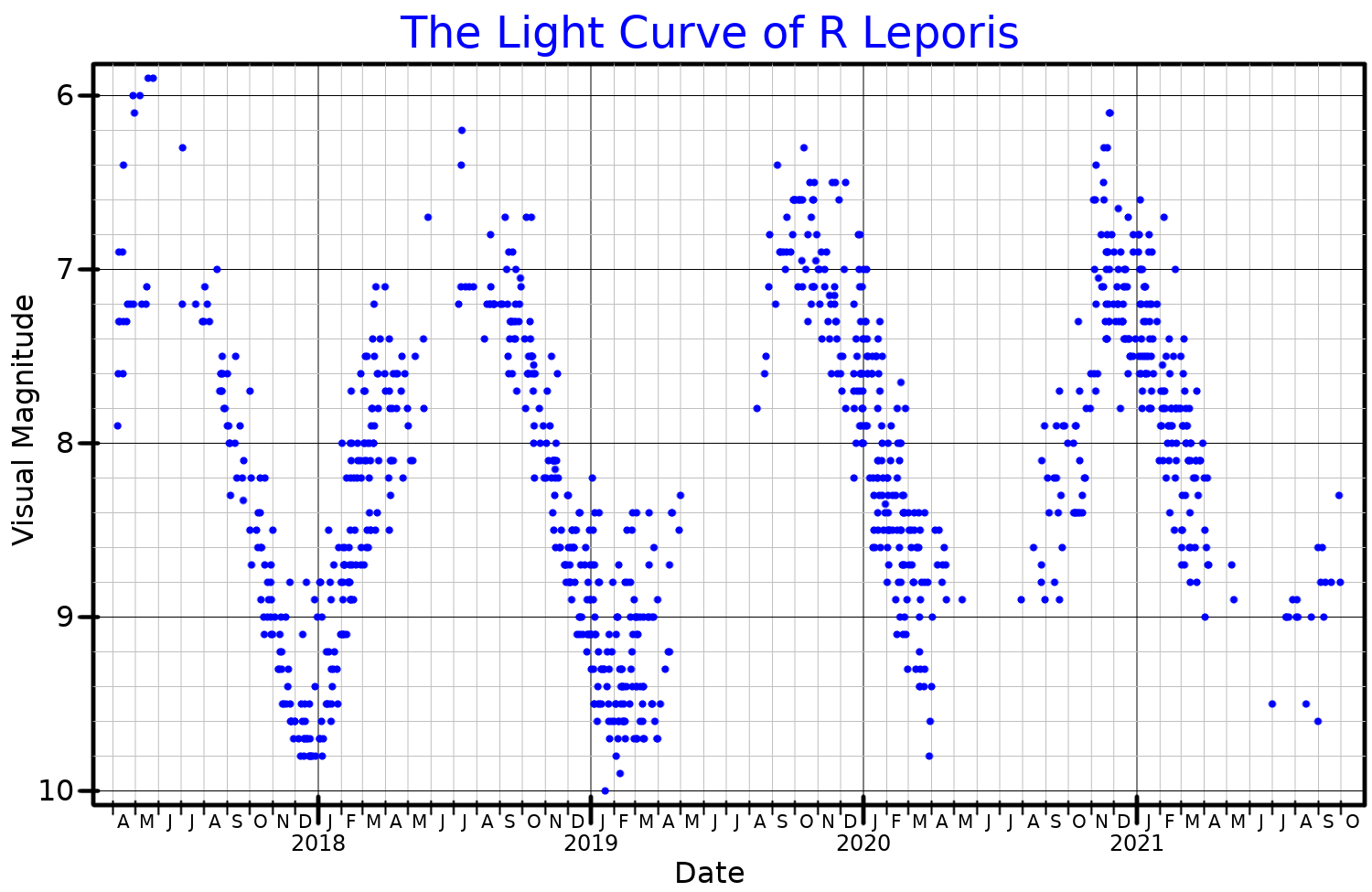
The light curve of R Leporis from AAVSO V band data
