= Mira =

Binary star system in the constellation Cetus

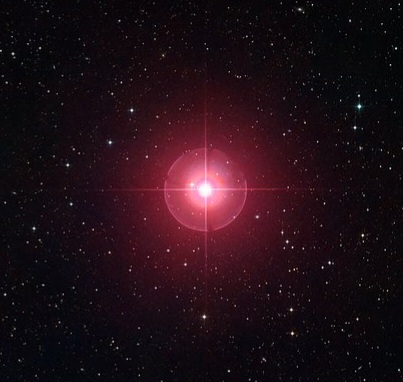
- Mira imaged by European Southern Observatory

Observation data Epoch J2000.0 Equinox ICRS
- Constellation: Cetus
- Right ascension: 02^{h} 19^{m} 20.79210^{s}
- Declination: −02° 58′ 39.4956″
- Apparent magnitude (V): 2.0 to 10.1 + 9.5–12.0

Characteristics
- Spectral type: M7 IIIe (M5e-M9e) + DA
- U−B color index: +0.08
- B−V color index: +1.53
- Variable type: Mira

Astrometry
Radial velocity (R_{v})	+63.8 km/s
Proper motion (μ)	RA: +9.33 mas/yr Dec.: −237.36 mas/yr
Parallax (π)	10.91±1.22 mas
Distance	approx. 300 ly (approx. 90 pc)
Absolute magnitude (M_{V})	+0.99 (variable)

Orbit
Period (P)	276.50+48.2 −8.5 yr
Semi-major axis (a)	0.5329+0.0064 −0.0390″
Eccentricity (e)	0.665+0.0411 −0.1400
Inclination (i)	126.6+0.4 −0.9°
Longitude of the node (Ω)	149.9+3.5 −9.5°
Periastron epoch (T)	2076.54+10.00 −2.80
Argument of periastron (ω) (secondary)	212.6+6.2 −21.0°

Details

A
Mass	~1 M_{☉}
Radius	332–402 R_{☉}
Luminosity (bolometric)	8,400–9,360 L_{☉}
Temperature	2,918–3,192 K
Age	6 Gyr

B
Mass	0.24±0.04 or 0.42±0.04 M_{☉}
Radius	0.015 or 0.020 R_{☉}
Temperature	14,000 K

Other designations
- Stella Mira, Collum Ceti, Wonderful Star, ο Ceti, 68 Ceti, BD−03°353, HD 14386, HIP 10826, HR 681, SAO 129825, WDS J02193-0259A, LTT 1179
- Mira B: VZ Cet, ο Cet B, WDS J02193-0259Ab, CCDM J02194-0258P, WD 0216-032

Database references
SIMBAD	A
- B

Mira (pronounced /ˈmaɪrə/, MY-rə) is a binary star system in the constellation Cetus. It has the Bayer designation Omicron Ceti, which is Latinized from ο Ceti, and abbreviated Omicron Cet or ο Cet. The system consists of a variable red giant (Mira A) along with a white dwarf companion (Mira B). Mira A is a pulsating variable star and was the first non-supernova variable star discovered, with the possible exception of Algol. It is the prototype of the Mira variables. The system lies at a distance of 300 light-years (92 parsecs).

== Nomenclature ==
ο Ceti (Latinised to Omicron Ceti) is the star's Bayer designation. It was named Mira (Latin for 'wonderful' or 'astonishing') by Johannes Hevelius in his Historiola Mirae Stellae (1662). In 2016, the International Astronomical Union organized a Working Group on Star Names (WGSN) to catalog and standardize proper names for stars. The WGSN's first bulletin of July 2016 included a table of the first two batches of names approved by the WGSN, which included Mira for ο Ceti A.

== Observation history ==
Mira (circled) in the constellation Cetus

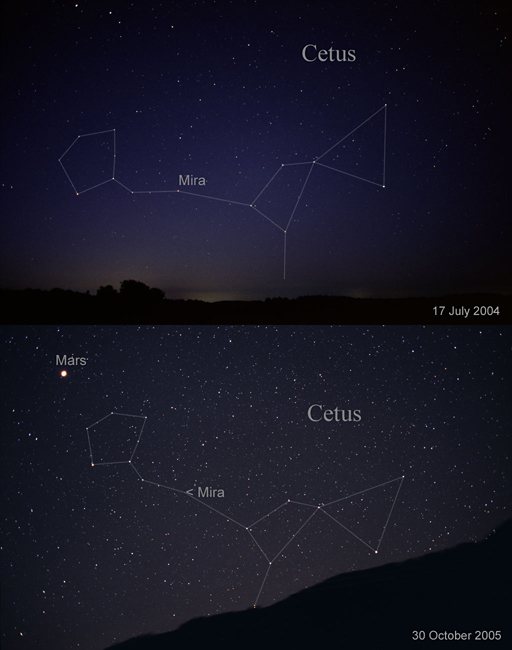
Mira at two different times

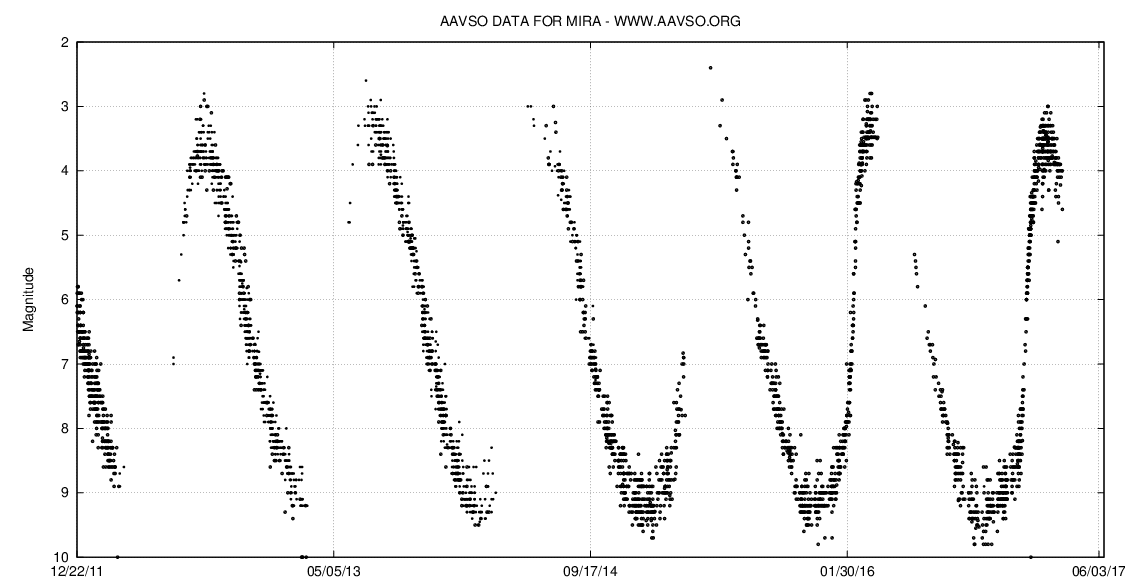
Visual light curve of Mira, generated using the AAVSO light curve generator tool

Evidence that the variability of Mira was known in ancient China, Babylon or Greece is at best only circumstantial. What is certain is that the variability of Mira was recorded by the astronomer David Fabricius beginning on August 3, 1596. Observing what he thought was the planet Mercury (later identified as Jupiter), he needed a reference star for comparing positions and picked a previously unremarked third-magnitude star nearby. By August 21, however, it had increased in brightness by one magnitude, then by October had faded from view. Fabricius assumed it was a nova, but then saw it again on February 16, 1609.

In 1638 Johannes Holwarda determined a period of the star's reappearances, eleven months; he is often credited with the discovery of Mira's variability. Johannes Hevelius was observing it at the same time and named it Mira in 1662, for it acted like no other known star. Ismail Bouillaud then estimated its period at 333 days, less than one day off the modern value of 332 days. Bouillaud's measurement may not have been erroneous: Mira is known to vary slightly in period, and may even be slowly changing over time. The star is estimated to be a six-billion-year-old red giant.

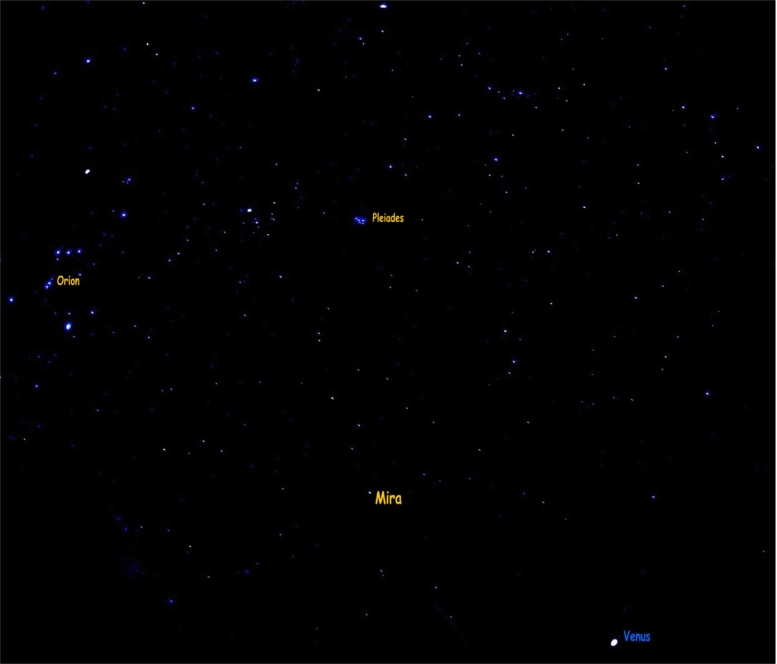
Mira as seen from the Earth

There is considerable speculation as to whether Mira had been observed prior to Fabricius. Certainly Algol's history (known for certain as a variable only in 1667, but with legends and such dating back to antiquity showing that it had been observed with suspicion for millennia) suggests that Mira might have been known, too. Karl Manitius, a modern translator of Hipparchus' Commentary on Aratus, has suggested that certain lines from that second-century text may be about Mira. The other pre-telescopic Western catalogs of Ptolemy, al-Sufi, Ulugh Beg and Tycho Brahe turn up no mentions, even as a regular star. There are three observations from Chinese and Korean archives, in 1596, 1070 and the same year when Hipparchus would have made his observation (134 BC) that are suggestive.

An estimate obtained in 1925 from interferometry by Francis G. Pease at the Mount Wilson Observatory gave Mira a diameter of 250-260 million miles (402 to 418 million km, or approximately 290-300 R_{☉}), making it the then-second largest star known and comparable to historical estimates of Betelgeuse, surpassed only by Antares. On the contrary, Otto Struve thought of Mira as a red supergiant with an approximate radius of 500 R_{☉}, while modern consensus accepts Mira to be a highly evolved asymptotic giant branch star.

== Distance and background Information ==
Pre-Hipparcos estimates centered on 220 light-years; while Hipparcos data from the 2007 reduction suggest a distance of 299 light-years, with a margin of error of 11%. The age of Mira is suspected to be about 6 billion years old. Its gaseous material is scattered, as much as one-thousandth as thin as the air around us. Mira is among the coolest known bright stars of the red giant class, with a temperature ranging from 3,000 to 4,000 degrees Fahrenheit (1,600 to 2,200 degrees Celsius). As with other long-period variables, Mira's deep red color at minimum pales to a lighter orange as the star brightens. Within the next few million years, Mira will discard its outer layers and become a planetary nebula, leaving behind a white dwarf.

== Stellar system ==
This binary star system consists of a red giant (Mira, designated Mira A) undergoing mass loss and a high-temperature white dwarf companion (Mira B) that is accreting mass from the primary. Such an arrangement of stars is known as a symbiotic system and this is the closest such symbiotic pair to the Sun. Examination of this system by the Chandra X-ray Observatory shows a direct mass exchange along a bridge of matter from the primary to the white dwarf. The two stars are currently separated by about 70 astronomical units.

=== Component A ===
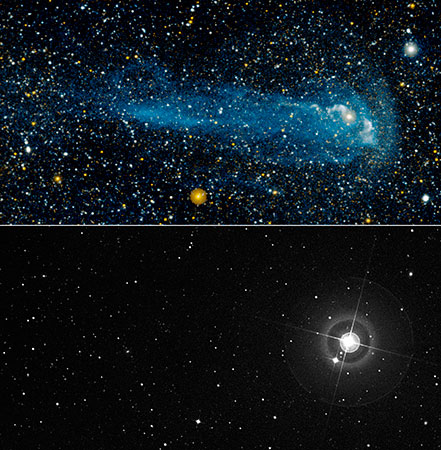
Mira in UV and visible light

Mira A is currently an asymptotic giant branch (AGB) star, in the thermally pulsing AGB phase. Each pulse lasts a decade or more, and an amount of time on the order of 10,000 years passes between each pulse. With every pulse cycle Mira increases in luminosity and the pulses grow stronger. This is causing dynamic instability in Mira, resulting in dramatic changes in luminosity and size over shorter, irregular time periods.

The overall shape of Mira A has been observed to change, exhibiting pronounced departures from symmetry. These appear to be caused by bright spots on the surface that evolve their shape on time scales of 3–14 months. Observations of Mira A in the ultraviolet band by the Hubble Space Telescope have shown a plume-like feature pointing toward the companion star.

==== Variability ====
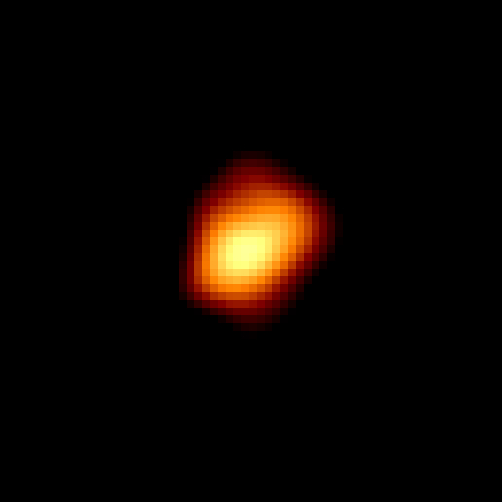
Mira as seen by the Hubble Space Telescope in August 1997

Mira A is a variable star, specifically the prototypical Mira variable. The 6,000 to 7,000 known stars of this class are all red giants whose surfaces pulsate in such a way as to increase and decrease in brightness over periods ranging from about 80 to more than 1,000 days.

In the particular case of Mira, its increases in brightness take it up to about magnitude 3.5 on average, placing it among the brighter stars in the Cetus constellation. Individual cycles vary too; well-attested maxima go as high as magnitude 2.0 in brightness and as low as 4.9, a range almost 15 times in brightness, and there are historical suggestions that the real spread may be three times this or more. Minima range much less, and have historically been between 8.6 and 10.1, a factor of four times in luminosity. The total swing in brightness from absolute maximum to absolute minimum (two events which did not occur on the same cycle) is 1,700 times. Mira emits the vast majority of its radiation in the infrared, and its variability in that band is only about two magnitudes. The shape of its light curve is of an increase over about 100 days, and the return to minimum taking twice as long. Contemporary approximate maxima for Mira:

- Oct 21–31, 1999
- Sep 21–30, 2000
- Aug 21–31, 2001
- Jul 21–31, 2002
- Jun 21–30, 2003
- May 21–31, 2004
- Apr 11–20, 2005
- Mar 11–20, 2006
- Feb 1–10, 2007
- Jan 21–31, 2008
- Dec 21–31, 2008
- Nov 21–30, 2009
- Oct 21–31, 2010
- Sep 21–30, 2011
- Aug 27, 2012
- Jul 26, 2013
- May 12, 2014
- Apr 9, 2015
- Mar 6, 2016
- Jan 31, 2017
- Dec 29, 2017
- Nov 26, 2018
- Oct 24, 2019
- Sep 20, 2020
- Aug 18, 2021
- Jul 16, 2022
- Jun 13, 2023
- May 10, 2024

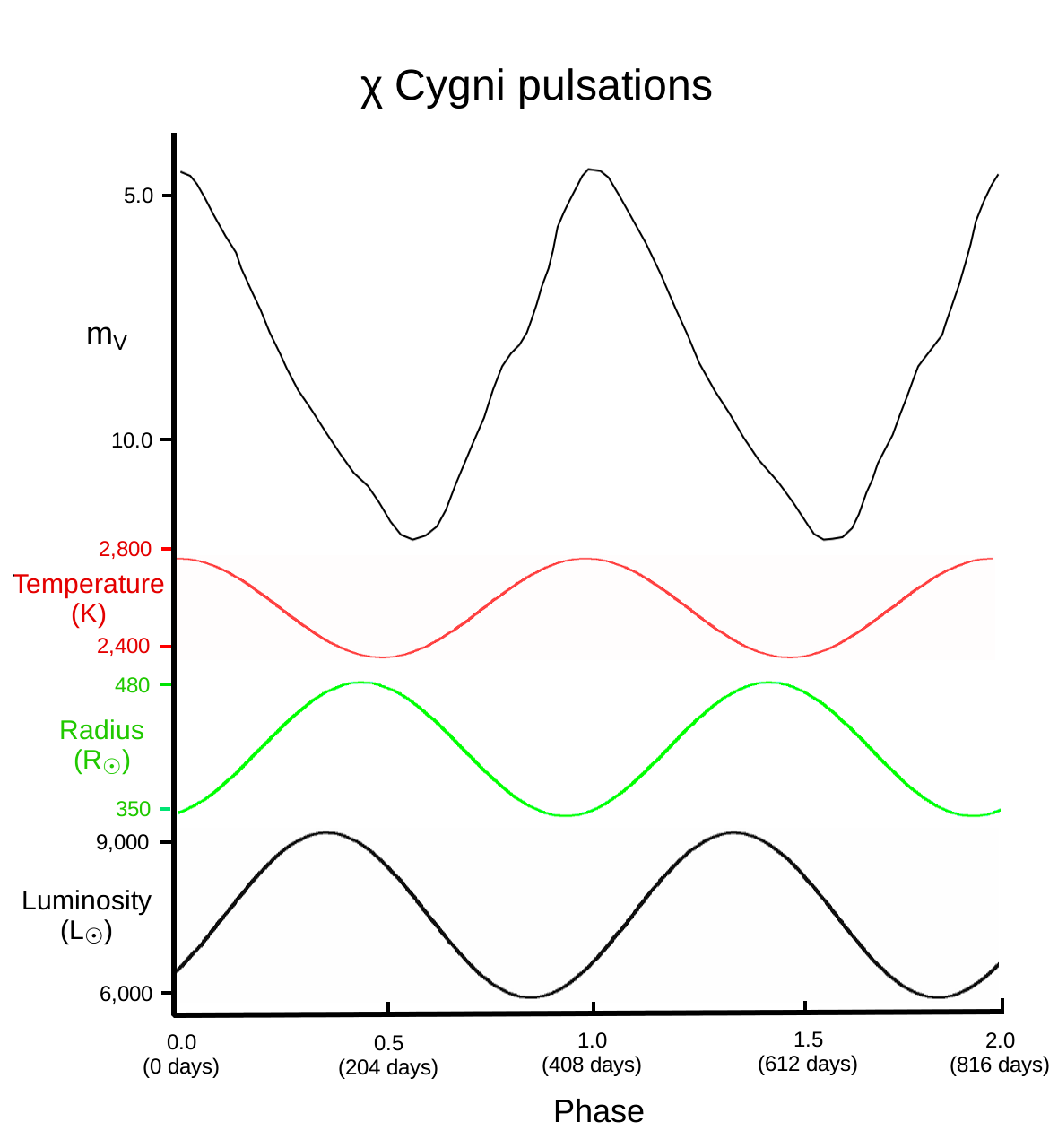
Pulsations in χ Cygni, showing the relation between the visual light curve, temperature, radius and luminosity typical of Mira variable stars

From northern temperate latitudes, Mira is generally not visible between late March and June due to its proximity to the Sun. This means that at times several years can pass without it appearing as a naked-eye object.

The pulsations of Mira variables cause the star to expand and contract, and to change its temperature. The temperature is highest slightly after the visual maximum, and lowest slightly before minimum. The photosphere, measured at the Rosseland radius, is smallest just before visual maximum and close to the time of maximum temperature. The largest size is reached slightly before the time of lowest temperature. The bolometric luminosity is proportional to the fourth power of the temperature and the square of the radius, but the radius varies by over 20% and the temperature by less than 10%.

In Mira, the highest luminosity occurs close to the time when the star is hottest and smallest. The visual magnitude is determined both by the luminosity and by the proportion of the radiation that occurs at visual wavelengths. Only a small proportion of the radiation is emitted at visual wavelengths and this proportion is very strongly influenced by the temperature (Planck's law). Combined with the overall luminosity changes, this creates the very big visual magnitude variation with the maximum occurring when the temperature is high.

Infrared VLTI measurements of Mira at phases 0.13, 0.18, 0.26, 0.40 and 0.47, show that the radius varies from 332±38 R_{☉} at phase 0.13 just after maximum to 402±46 R_{☉} at phase 0.40 approaching minimum. The temperature at phase 0.13 is 3,192±200 K and 2,918±183 K at phase 0.26 about halfway from maximum to minimum. The luminosity is calculated to be 9,360±3,140 L_{☉} at phase 0.13 and 8,400±2,820 L_{☉} at phase 0.26.

The pulsations of Mira have the effect of expanding its photosphere by around 50% compared to a non-pulsating star. In the case of Mira, if it was not pulsating it is modelled to have a radius of only around 240 R_{☉}.

==== Mass loss ====
Ultraviolet studies of Mira by NASA's Galaxy Evolution Explorer (GALEX) space telescope have revealed that it sheds a trail of material from the outer envelope, leaving a tail 13 light-years in length, formed over tens of thousands of years. It is thought that a hot bow wave of compressed plasma/gas is the cause of the tail; the bow wave is a result of the interaction of the stellar wind from Mira A with gas in interstellar space, through which Mira is moving at an extremely high speed of 130 kilometres per second (290,000 miles per hour). The tail consists of material stripped from the head of the bow wave, which is visible in ultraviolet observations. Mira's bow shock will eventually evolve into a planetary nebula, the form of which will be considerably affected by the motion through the interstellar medium (ISM). Mira’s tail offers a unique opportunity to study how stars like the Sun die and ultimately seed new planetary systems. As Mira hurls along, its tail drops off carbon, oxygen and other important elements needed for new stars, planets, and possibly even life to form. This tail material, visible now for the first time, has been shed over the past 30,000 years.

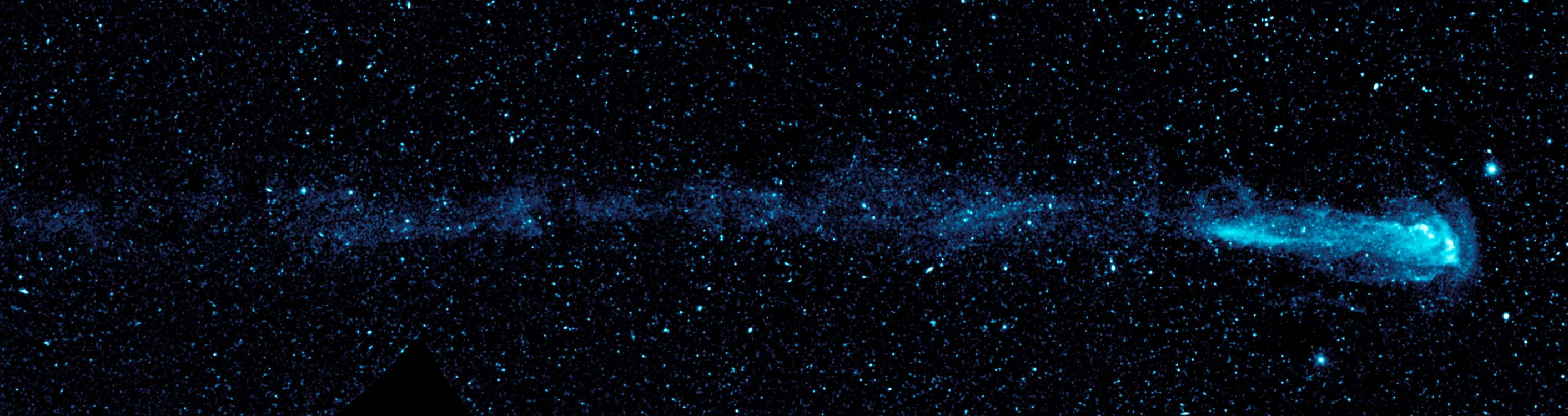
Ultraviolet mosaic of Mira's bow shock and tail obtained using NASA's Galaxy Evolution Explorer (GALEX)

=== Component B ===
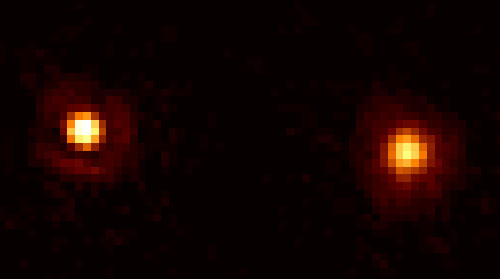
The red giant star Mira (right), and its companion Mira B on the left. Taken on December 11, 1995, by the Hubble Space Telescope using the Faint Object Camera

The companion star is 0.487±0.006 arcseconds away from the main star. It was resolved by the Hubble Space Telescope in 1995, when it was 70 astronomical units from the primary; and results were announced in 1997. The HST ultraviolet images and later X-ray images by the Chandra space telescope show a spiral of gas rising off Mira in the direction of Mira B. The companion's orbital period around Mira is approximately 497.9 years.

In 2007, observations showed a protoplanetary disc around the companion, Mira B. This disc is being accreted from material in the solar wind from Mira and could eventually form new planets. These observations hinted that the companion was a main-sequence star of around 0.7 solar mass and spectral type K, instead of a white dwarf as originally thought. However, in 2010 further research indicated that Mira B is, in fact, a white dwarf.
