= Lepus in Chinese astronomy =

According to traditional Chinese uranography, the modern constellation Lepus is located within the western quadrant of the sky, which is symbolized as The White Tiger of the West (西方白虎, Xī Fāng Bái Hǔ)

The name of the western constellation in modern Chinese is 天兔座 (tiān tù zuò), meaning "the celestial rabbit constellation".

== Stars ==
The map of Chinese constellation in constellation Lepus area consists of :

Four Symbols	Mansion (Chinese name)	Romanization	Translation	Asterisms (Chinese name)	Romanization	Translation	Western star name	Proper Name	Chinese star name	Romanization	Translation
The White Tiger of the West (西方白虎)
The White Tiger of the West (西方白虎)	畢	Bì	Net	九斿	Jiǔliú	Imperial Military Flag	1 Lep		九斿九	Jiǔliújiǔ	9th star
The White Tiger of the West (西方白虎)	參	Shēn	Three Stars	屏	Píng	Screen					
The White Tiger of the West (西方白虎)	參	Shēn	Three Stars	屏	Píng	Screen	μ Lep	Bade	屏一	Píngyī	1st star
The White Tiger of the West (西方白虎)	參	Shēn	Three Stars	屏	Píng	Screen	ε Lep	Ping	屏二	Píngèr	2nd star
The White Tiger of the West (西方白虎)	參	Shēn	Three Stars	軍井	Jūnjǐng	Military Well					
The White Tiger of the West (西方白虎)	參	Shēn	Three Stars	軍井	Jūnjǐng	Military Well	ι Lep		軍井一	Jūnjǐngyī	1st star
The White Tiger of the West (西方白虎)	參	Shēn	Three Stars	軍井	Jūnjǐng	Military Well	κ Lep		軍井二	Jūnjǐngèr	2nd star
The White Tiger of the West (西方白虎)	參	Shēn	Three Stars	軍井	Jūnjǐng	Military Well	λ Lep		軍井三	Jūnjǐngsān	3rd star
The White Tiger of the West (西方白虎)	參	Shēn	Three Stars	軍井	Jūnjǐng	Military Well	ν Lep		軍井四	Jūnjǐngsì	4th star
The White Tiger of the West (西方白虎)	參	Shēn	Three Stars	廁	Cè	Toilet					
The White Tiger of the West (西方白虎)	參	Shēn	Three Stars	廁	Cè	Toilet	α Lep	Arneb			
The White Tiger of the West (西方白虎)	參	Shēn	Three Stars	廁	Cè	Toilet	α Lep	Arneb	廁一	Cèyī	1st star
The White Tiger of the West (西方白虎)	參	Shēn	Three Stars	廁	Cè	Toilet	α Lep	Arneb	廁星一	Cèxīngyī	1st star
The White Tiger of the West (西方白虎)	參	Shēn	Three Stars	廁	Cè	Toilet	α Lep	Arneb	天廁一	Tiāncèyī	1st celestial toilet
The White Tiger of the West (西方白虎)	參	Shēn	Three Stars	廁	Cè	Toilet	α Lep	Arneb	天廁西北星	Tiāncèxīběixīng	Northwestern star of celestial toilet
The White Tiger of the West (西方白虎)	參	Shēn	Three Stars	廁	Cè	Toilet	β Lep	Nihal			
The White Tiger of the West (西方白虎)	參	Shēn	Three Stars	廁	Cè	Toilet	β Lep	Nihal	廁二	Cèèr	2nd star
The White Tiger of the West (西方白虎)	參	Shēn	Three Stars	廁	Cè	Toilet	β Lep	Nihal	廁星二	Cèxīngèr	2nd star
The White Tiger of the West (西方白虎)	參	Shēn	Three Stars	廁	Cè	Toilet	β Lep	Nihal	天廁二	Tiāncèèr	2nd celestial toilet
The White Tiger of the West (西方白虎)	參	Shēn	Three Stars	廁	Cè	Toilet	β Lep	Nihal	天廁西南星	Tiāncèxīnánxīng	Southwestern star of celestial toilet
The White Tiger of the West (西方白虎)	參	Shēn	Three Stars	廁	Cè	Toilet	β Lep	Nihal	天阴西星	Tiānyīnxīxīng	Star in the northwest of Yin Force constellation
The White Tiger of the West (西方白虎)	參	Shēn	Three Stars	廁	Cè	Toilet	γ Lep		廁三	Cèsān	3rd star
The White Tiger of the West (西方白虎)	參	Shēn	Three Stars	廁	Cè	Toilet	δ Lep		廁四	Cèsì	4th star

== See also ==
- Traditional Chinese star names
- Chinese constellations
