= List of star names in Lepus =

This is the list of the proper names for the stars in the constellation Lepus. (Used in modern Western astronomy and uranography only).

== List ==
| star | proper name | etymon |
|---|---|---|
| α Lep | Arneb | Arabic |
| β Lep | Nihal | Arabic |
| ε Lep | Ping | Chinese |
| ζ Lep | Darlugal | Sumerian |
| μ Lep | Bade | Balinese |

== Etymologies ==
=== α Lep ===
- Arneb, Elarneb:

＜ (ar) arnab, "hare" ＜ (scientific Arabic) al-Arnab, "the Hare", for the whole constellation.

- Arsh:

＜ (ar) ‘arsh, throne ＜ (indigenous Arabic) ‘Arsh al-Jawzā', "the Throne of Jawzā'", for α, β, γ, δ Lep.

=== β Lep ===
- Nihal:

＜ (ar) nihāl, "quenching their thirst" ＜ (indigenous Arabic) al-Nihāl, "(the Camels ) Beginning to Quench Their Thirst", for α, β, γ, δ Lep.

== See also ==
- List of stars in Lepus
- List of star names
