= RU Camelopardalis =

Star in the constellation Camelopardalis

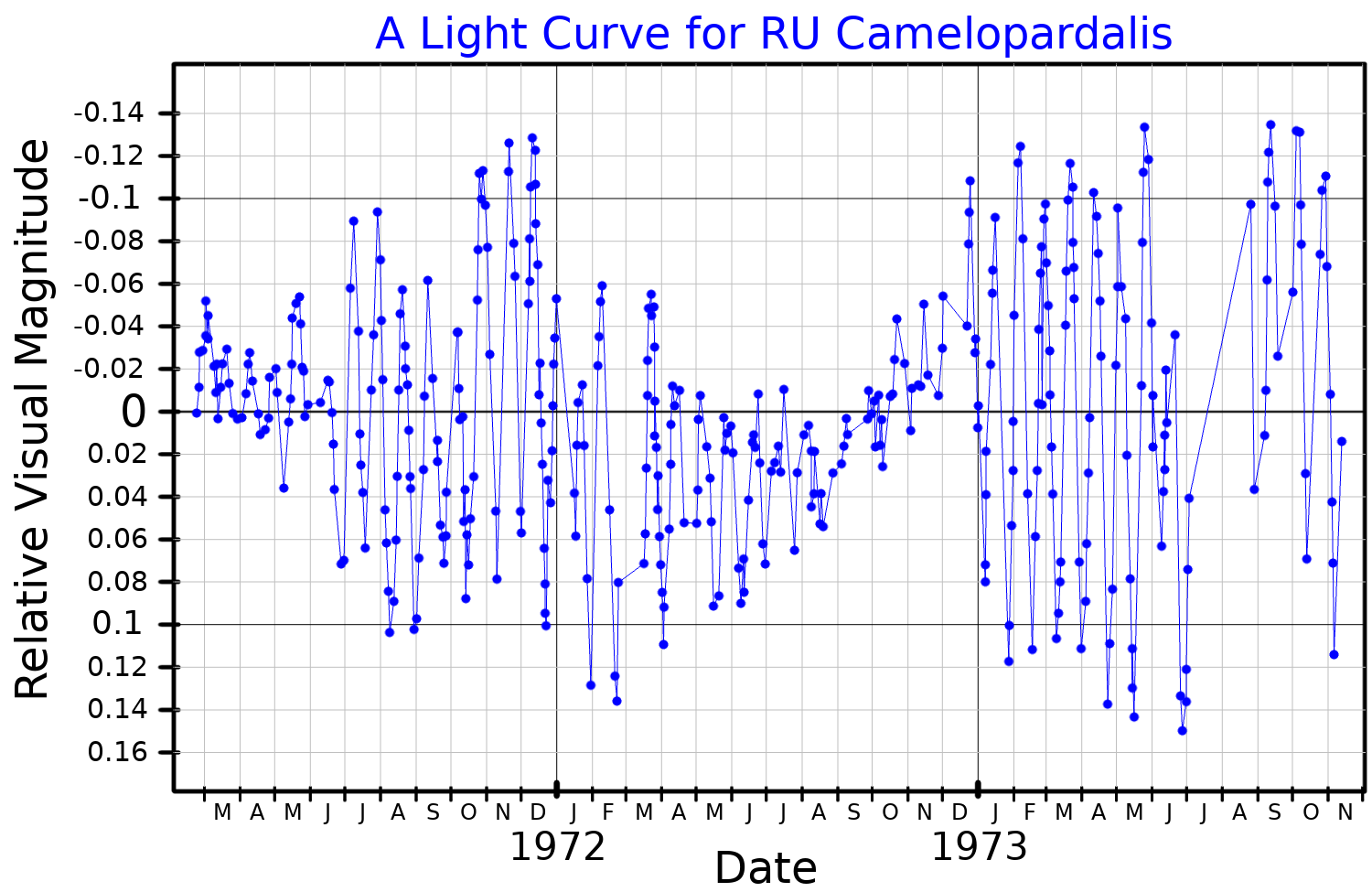
- A visual band light curve for RU Camelopardalis, adapted from Kollath and Szeidl (1993)

Observation data Epoch J2000 Equinox ICRS
- Constellation: Camelopardalis
- Right ascension: 07^{h} 21^{m} 44.11647^{s}
- Declination: +69° 40′ 14.7192″
- Apparent magnitude (V): 8.10 - 9.79

Characteristics
- Evolutionary stage: AGB
- Spectral type: C0,1-C3,2e(K0-R0)
- U−B color index: +0.97 - +1.17 (+0.9 - +1.3)
- B−V color index: +1.09 - +1.16 (+1.0 - +1.4)
- Variable type: W Vir

Astrometry
Radial velocity (R_{v})	21.20 km/s
Proper motion (μ)	RA: +0.24 mas/yr Dec.: −2.10 mas/yr
Parallax (π)	0.71±0.80 mas
Absolute magnitude (M_{V})	−2.4

Details
Mass	0.57 M_{☉}
Luminosity	417 L_{☉}
Surface gravity (log g)	1.44 cgs
Temperature	5,250 K
Metallicity [Fe/H]	−0.37 dex

Other designations
- RU Cam, BD+69°417, HD 56167, HIP 35681, SAO 14157, 2MASS J07214412+6940147, AAVSO 0710+69

Database references
SIMBAD	data

RU Camelopardalis, or RU Cam, is a W Virginis variable (type II Cepheid) in the constellation of Camelopardalis. It is also a carbon star, which is very unusual for a Cepheid variable.

== History ==
RU Cam was reported as a new variable star in 1907. It was quickly recognised as one of the Cepheid class of variable stars.

The first detailed study of the spectrum of RU Cam showed that it changed during the brightness variations. From partway down the descending branch of the light curve to just after minimum brightness, the spectrum is class R with hydrogen absorption lines. The spectrum then develops hydrogen emission lines. For several days either side of maximum brightness, the spectrum becomes a relatively normal class K.

RU Cam remained a somewhat unusual W Virginis variable until 1964, when the relatively regular pulsation of about 1 magnitude almost entirely stopped. Since then the pulsations have varied from cycle to cycle, with amplitudes changing from several tenths of a magnitude to almost zero. The light curve has a more sinusoidal shape than when it was pulsating at full amplitude and the period changes erratically between 17.4 and 26.6 days.

== Properties ==
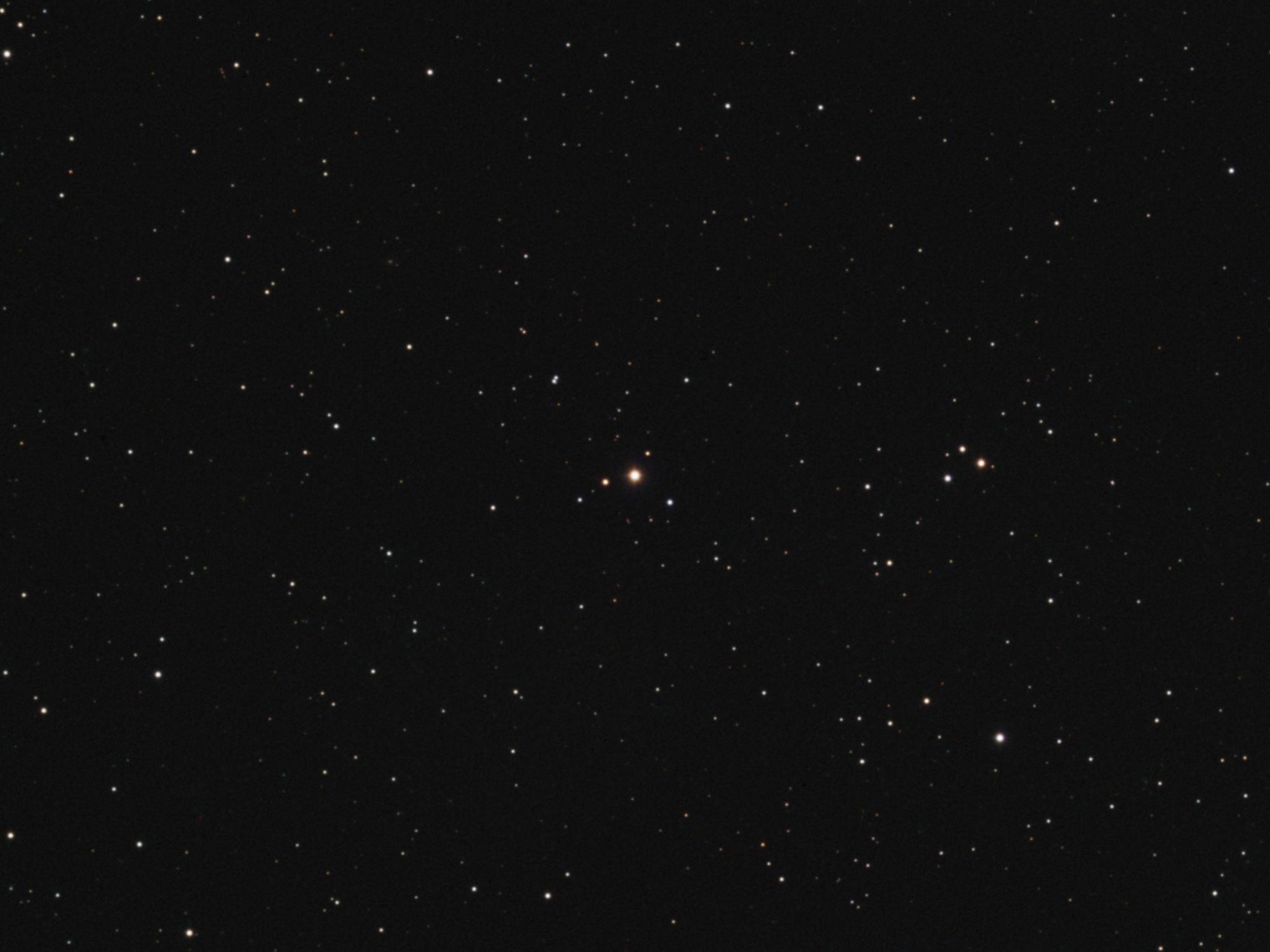
RU Camelopardalis in optical light

RU Camelopardalis is both a Carbon star and a type II Cepheid variable star. This is unusual but not unique. At least five other relatively bright examples are known, two of which are of the BL Herculis sub-type. The atmosphere contains more carbon than oxygen but is not deficient in hydrogen. This can be explained as the result of triple-alpha helium burning being processed through a CNO cycle and convected to the surface. This process occurs in some of the more massive asymptotic giant branch (AGB) stars at the third dredge-up. W Virginis stars are typically metal-poor and enriched by s-process elements, but this is not the case for RU Cam which has near-solar metallicity and no heavy metal enhancement.

W Virginis variables are thought to be AGB stars executing a blue loop due to a thermal pulse from the helium burning shell. These stars cross the instability strip and undergo very regular pulsations. RU Cam fits this model reasonably well despite its peculiarities. Its temperature of around 5,000 K and luminosity several hundred times the sun's place it on or near the instability strip, and its mass about 0.6 M_{☉} is typical of AGB stars.

The brightness variations of RU Cam are caused by pulsations which cause both the temperature and radius to vary. The temperature has been estimated to vary between 3,800 K and 5,650 K, with a change in the radius of 17 R_{☉} about an average radius of 38 R_{☉}. Even prior to 1965, the colour variations suggested a smaller temperature range of 4,220 K - 5,240 K. The maximum temperature occurs at the same time as the minimum radius, and this is when the star is near its brightest.

== Evolution ==
The evolution of a star executing a blue loop from the AGB is expected to be rapid. Period changes in RU Cam before 1965 suggest that it would cross the entire instability strip in 31,000 years. Any secular period changes since then have been masked by irregularities. It is predicted that the temperature of RU Cam is increasing and it is approaching, or leaving, the bluer edge of the instability strip, in which case the pulsations would stop completely. A blueward crossing is the first crossing of the instability strip and would be followed by a second crossing when the star cools back towards the AGB.
