= Yellow supergiant =

Star that has a supergiant luminosity class, with a spectral type of F or G

A yellow supergiant (YSG) is a star, generally of spectral type F or G, having a supergiant luminosity class (e.g. Ia or Ib). They are stars that have evolved away from the main sequence, expanding and becoming more luminous.

Yellow supergiants are hotter and smaller than red supergiants; naked eye examples include Polaris, Alpha Leporis, Alpha Persei, Delta Canis Majoris and Iota¹ Scorpii. Many of them are variable stars, mostly pulsating Cepheids such as δ Cephei itself.

== Spectrum ==
Yellow supergiants generally have spectral types of F and G, although sometimes late A or early K stars are included. These spectral types are characterised by hydrogen lines that are very strong in class A, weakening through F and G until they are very weak or absent in class K. Calcium H and K lines are present in late A spectra, but stronger in class F, and strongest in class G, before weakening again in cooler stars. Lines of ionised metals are strong in class A, weaker in class F and G, and absent from cooler stars. In class G, neutral metal lines are also found, along with CH molecular bands.

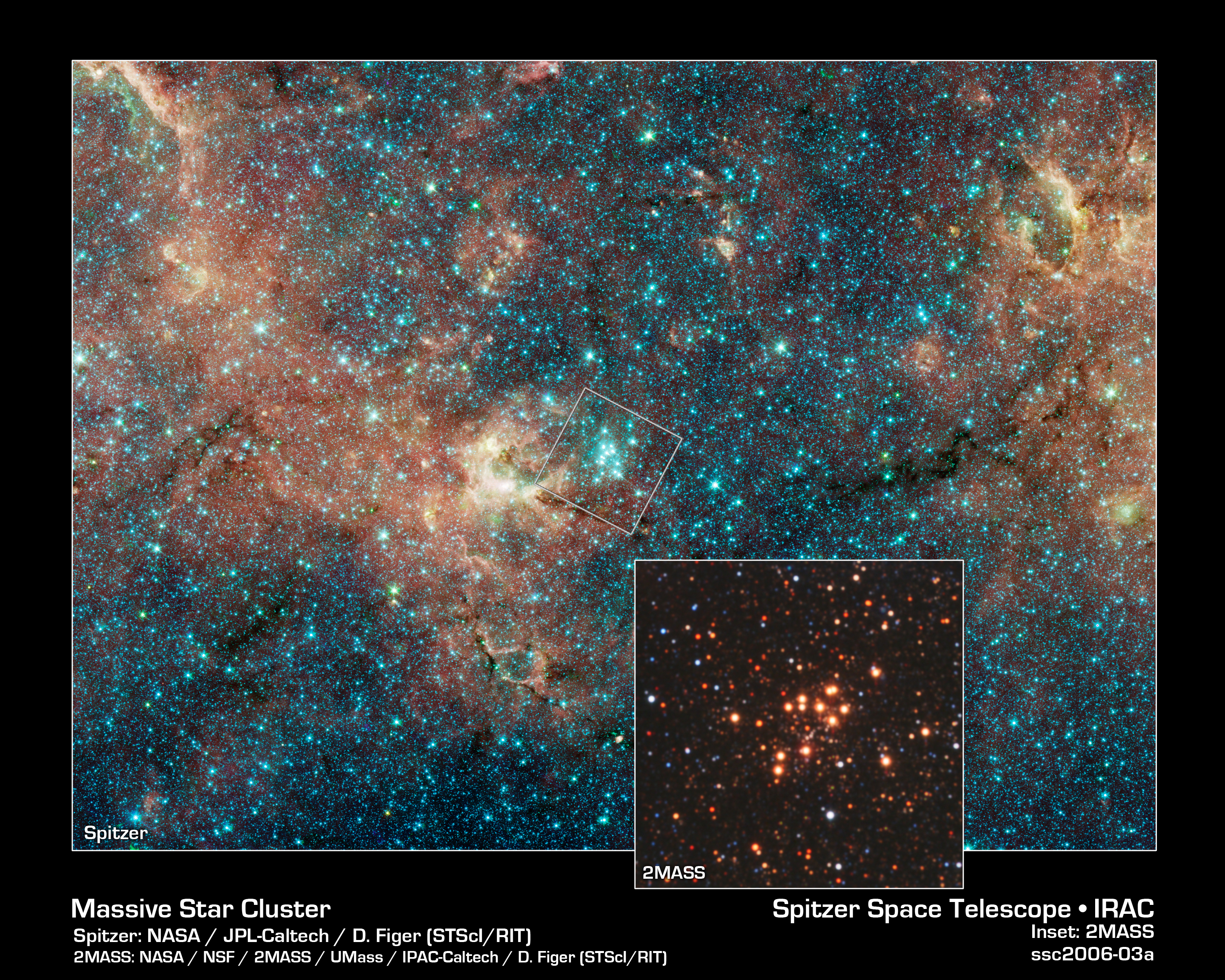
The massive RSGC1 cluster contains 14 red supergiants and one yellow supergiant.

Supergiants are identified in the Yerkes spectral classification by luminosity classes Ia and Ib, with intermediates such as Iab and Ia/ab sometimes being used. These luminosity classes are assigned using spectral lines that are sensitive to luminosity. Historically, the Ca H and K line strengths have been used for yellow stars, as well as the strengths of various metal lines. The neutral oxygen lines, such as the 777.3 nm triplet, have also been used since they are extremely sensitive to luminosity across a wide range of spectral types. Modern atmospheric models can accurately match all the spectral line strengths and profiles to give a spectral classification, or even skip straight to the physical parameters of the star, but in practice luminosity classes are still usually assigned by comparison against standard stars.

Some yellow supergiant spectral standard stars:

- F0 Ib: α Leporis
- F2 Ib: 89 Herculis
- F5 Ib: α Persei
- F8 Ia: δ Canis Majoris
- G0 Ib: μ Persei
- G2 Ib: α Aquarii
- G5 Ib: 9 Pegasi
- G8 Ib: ε Geminorum

== Properties ==
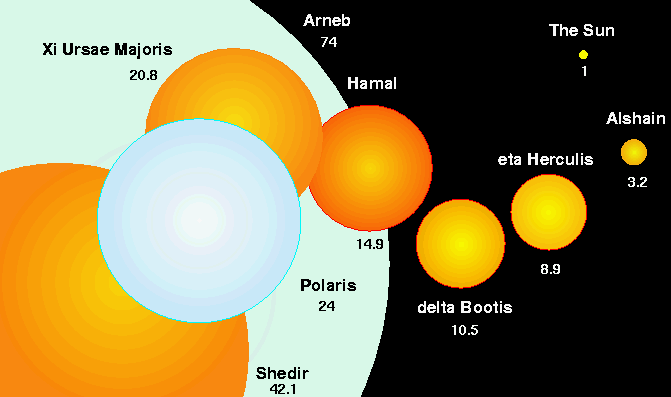
Size comparison of the Sun, yellow supergiants Polaris and Alpha Leporis (Arneb), and numerous red giants

Yellow supergiants have a relatively narrow range of temperatures corresponding to their spectral types, from about 4,000 K to 7,000 K. Their luminosities range from about 1,000 L_{☉} upwards, with the most luminous stars exceeding 100,000 L_{☉}. The high luminosities indicate that they are much larger than the Sun, from about 30 R_{☉} to several hundred R_{☉}.

The masses of yellow supergiants vary greatly, from less than the Sun for stars such as W Virginis, to 20 M_{☉} or more (e.g. V810 Centauri). Corresponding surface gravities (log(g) cgs) are around 1–2 for high-mass supergiants, but can be as low as 0 for low-mass supergiants.

Yellow supergiants are rare stars, much less common than red supergiants and main sequence stars. In M31 (Andromeda Galaxy), 16 yellow supergiants are seen associated with evolution from class O stars, of which there are around 25,000 visible.

== Variability ==
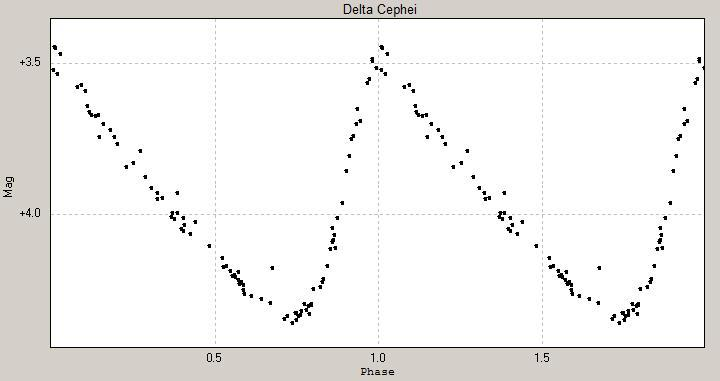
Light curve of Delta Cephei, a yellow supergiant classical Cepheid variable

Many yellow supergiants are in a region of the HR diagram known as the instability strip because their temperatures and luminosities cause them to be dynamically unstable. Most yellow supergiants observed in the instability strip are Cepheid variables, named for δ Cephei, which pulsate with well-defined periods that are related to their luminosities. This means they can be used as standard candles for determining the distance of stars knowing only their period of variability. Cepheids with longer periods are cooler and more luminous.

Two distinct types of Cepheid variable have been identified, which have different period–luminosity relationships: Classical Cepheid variables are young massive population I stars; type II Cepheids are older population II stars with low masses, including W Virginis variables, BL Herculis variables and RV Tauri variables. The Classical Cepheids are more luminous than the type II Cepheids with the same period.

R Coronae Borealis variables are often yellow supergiants, but their variability is produced by a different mechanism from the Cepheids. At irregular intervals, they become obscured by dust condensation around the star and their brightness drops dramatically.

== Evolution ==
Evolution of a 5 M_{☉} star, showing a blue loop and post-AGB track across the yellow supergiant region

Supergiants are stars that have evolved away from the main sequence after exhausting the hydrogen in their cores. Yellow supergiants are a heterogenous group of stars crossing the standard categories of stars in the HR diagram at various different stages of their evolution.

Stars more massive than 8–12 M_{☉} spend a few million years on the main sequence as class O and early B stars until the dense hydrogen in their cores becomes depleted. Then they expand and cool to become supergiants. They spend a few thousand years as a yellow supergiant while cooling, then spend one to four million years as a red supergiant, typically. Supergiants make up less than 1% of stars; though different proportions in the visible early eras of the universe. The relatively brief phases and concentration of matter explains the rarity of these stars.

Some red supergiants undergo a blue loop, temporarily re-heating and becoming yellow or even blue supergiants before cooling again. Stellar models show that blue loops rely on particular chemical makeups and other assumptions, but they are most likely for stars of low red supergiant mass. While cooling for the first time or when performing a sufficiently extended blue loop, yellow supergiants will cross the instability strip and pulsate as Classical Cepheid variables with periods around ten days and longer.

Intermediate mass stars leave the main sequence by cooling along the subgiant branch until they reach the red-giant branch. Stars more massive than about 2 M_{☉} have a sufficiently large helium core that it begins fusion before becoming degenerate. These stars will perform a blue loop.

For masses between about 5 M_{☉} and 12 M_{☉}, the blue loop can extend to F and G spectral types at luminosities reaching 1,000 L_{☉}. These stars may develop supergiant luminosity classes, especially if they are pulsating. When these stars cross the instability strip they will pulsate as short period Cepheids. Blue loops in these stars can last for around 10 million years, so this type of yellow supergiant is more common than the more luminous types.

Stars with masses similar to the sun develop degenerate helium cores after they leave the main sequence and ascend to the tip of the red-giant branch where they ignite helium in a flash. They then fuse core helium on the horizontal branch with luminosities too low to be considered supergiants.

Stars leaving the blue half of the horizontal branch to be classified in the asymptotic giant branch (AGB) pass through the yellow classifications and will pulsate as BL Herculis variables. Such yellow stars may be given a supergiant luminosity class despite their low masses but assisted by luminous pulsation. In the AGB thermal pulses from the helium-fusing shell of stars may cause a blue loop across the instability strip. Such stars will pulsate as W Virginis variables and again may be classified as relatively low luminosity yellow supergiants. When the hydrogen-fusing shell of a low or intermediate mass star of the AGB nears its surface, the cool outer layers are rapidly lost, which causes the star to heat up, eventually becoming a white dwarf. These stars have masses lower than the sun, but luminosities that can be 10,000 L_{☉} or higher, so they will become yellow supergiants for a short time. Post-AGB stars are believed to pulsate as RV Tauri variables when they cross the instability strip.

The evolutionary status of yellow supergiant R Coronae Borealis variables is unclear. They may be post-AGB stars reignited by a late helium shell flash, or they could be formed from white dwarf mergers.

It is expected that first-time yellow supergiants mature to the red supergiant stage without any supernova. The cores of some post-red supergiant yellow supergiants might collapse and trigger a supernova. A handful of supernovae have been associated with apparent yellow supergiant progenitors that are not luminous enough to be post-red supergiants. If these are confirmed then an explanation must be found for how a star of moderate mass still with a helium core would cause a core-collapse supernova. The obvious candidate in such cases is always some form of binary interaction.

Based on reports from Chinese astronomers in the 2nd/1st century BC, the red supergiant Betelgeuse was described as yellow, hinting it may have been a yellow supergiant at the time.

== Yellow hypergiants ==
Particularly luminous and unstable yellow supergiants are often grouped into a separate class of stars called the yellow hypergiants. These are mostly thought to be post-red supergiant stars, very massive stars that have lost a considerable portion of their outer layers and are now evolving towards becoming blue supergiants and Wolf-Rayet stars.
