= NGC 1954 =

Galaxy in the constellation Lepus

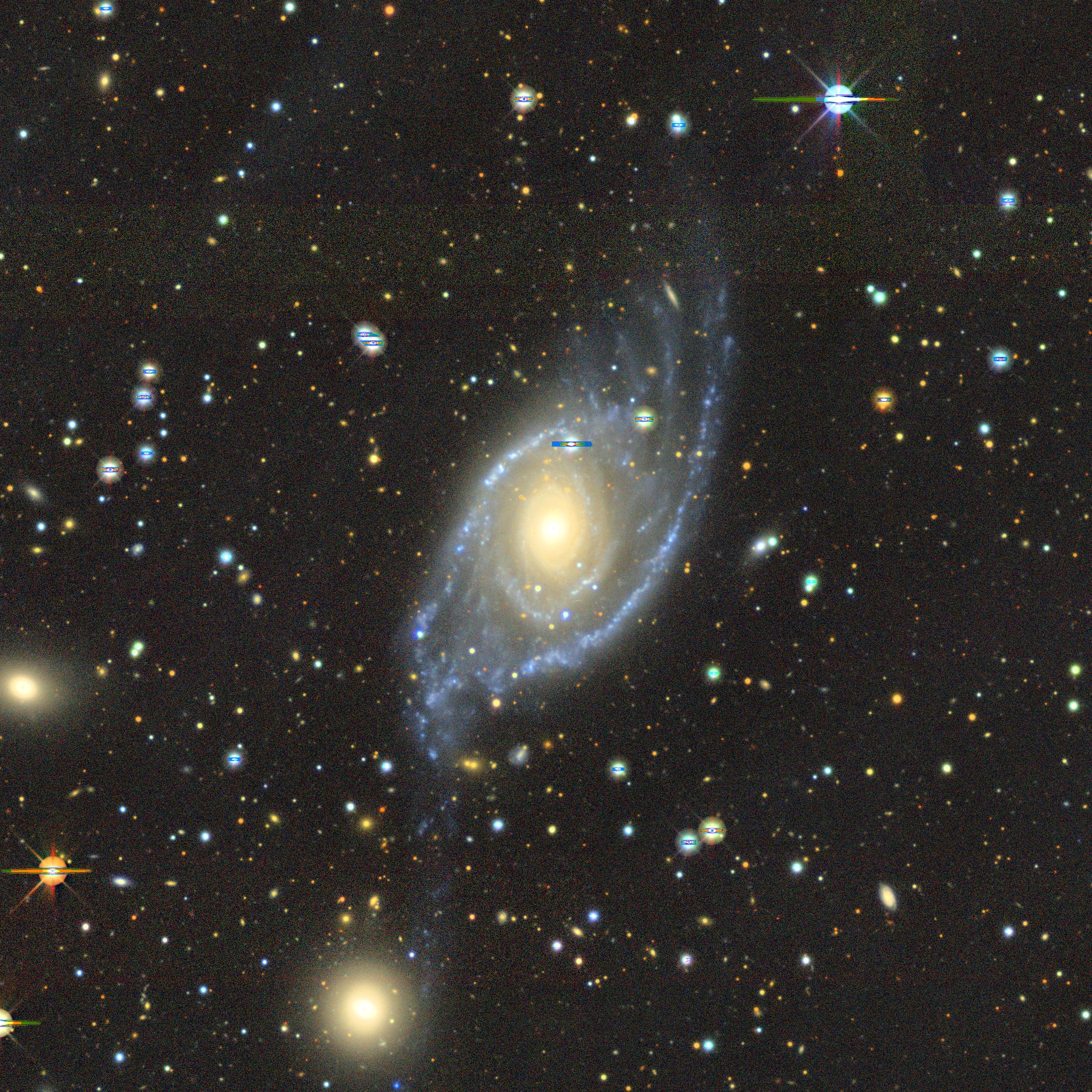
- NGC 1954 (center) and NGC 1957 (bottom, left of center) imaged by Legacy Surveys

Observation data (J2000 epoch)
- Constellation: Lepus
- Right ascension: 05^{h} 32^{m} 48.3509^{s}
- Declination: −14° 03′ 45.625″
- Redshift: 0.010437
- Heliocentric radial velocity: 3129 ± 2 km/s
- Distance: 152.6 ± 10.7 Mly (46.79 ± 3.28 Mpc)
- Apparent magnitude (V): 11.8

Characteristics
- Type: SA(rs)bc pec?
- Size: ~192,000 ly (58.87 kpc) (estimated)
- Apparent size (V): 4.2′ × 2.0′

Other designations
- IRAS 05305-1405, 2MASX J05324835-1403460, MCG -02-15-003, PGC 17422

NGC 1954 is a large spiral galaxy in the constellation of Lepus. Its velocity with respect to the cosmic microwave background is 3,172 ± 4 km/s, which corresponds to a Hubble distance of 46.8 ± 3.3 Mpc Mpc (~153 million light-years). It was discovered by German-British astronomer William Herschel on 14 December 1786.

The galaxy features two thin arcs which contain HII regions. The galaxy forms a pair with NGC 1957, which lies 5.1 arcminutes away. Other nearby galaxies include IC 2132, MCG -02-14-016, and MCG -03-15-006.

== Supernovae ==
Three supernovae have been observed in NGC 1954:

- SN 2010ko (Type Ia, mag. 16.8) was discovered by Simone Leonini on 5 December 2010.
- SN 2011fi (Type II, mag. 17.8), was discovered by Kōichi Itagaki on 27 August 2011.
- SN 2013ex (Type Ia, mag. 15.6) was discovered by the All Sky Automated Survey for SuperNovae (ASAS-SN) on 19 August 2013.

== See also ==
- List of NGC objects (1001–2000)
