= V810 Centauri =

Star in the constellation Centaurus

V810 Cen A/B
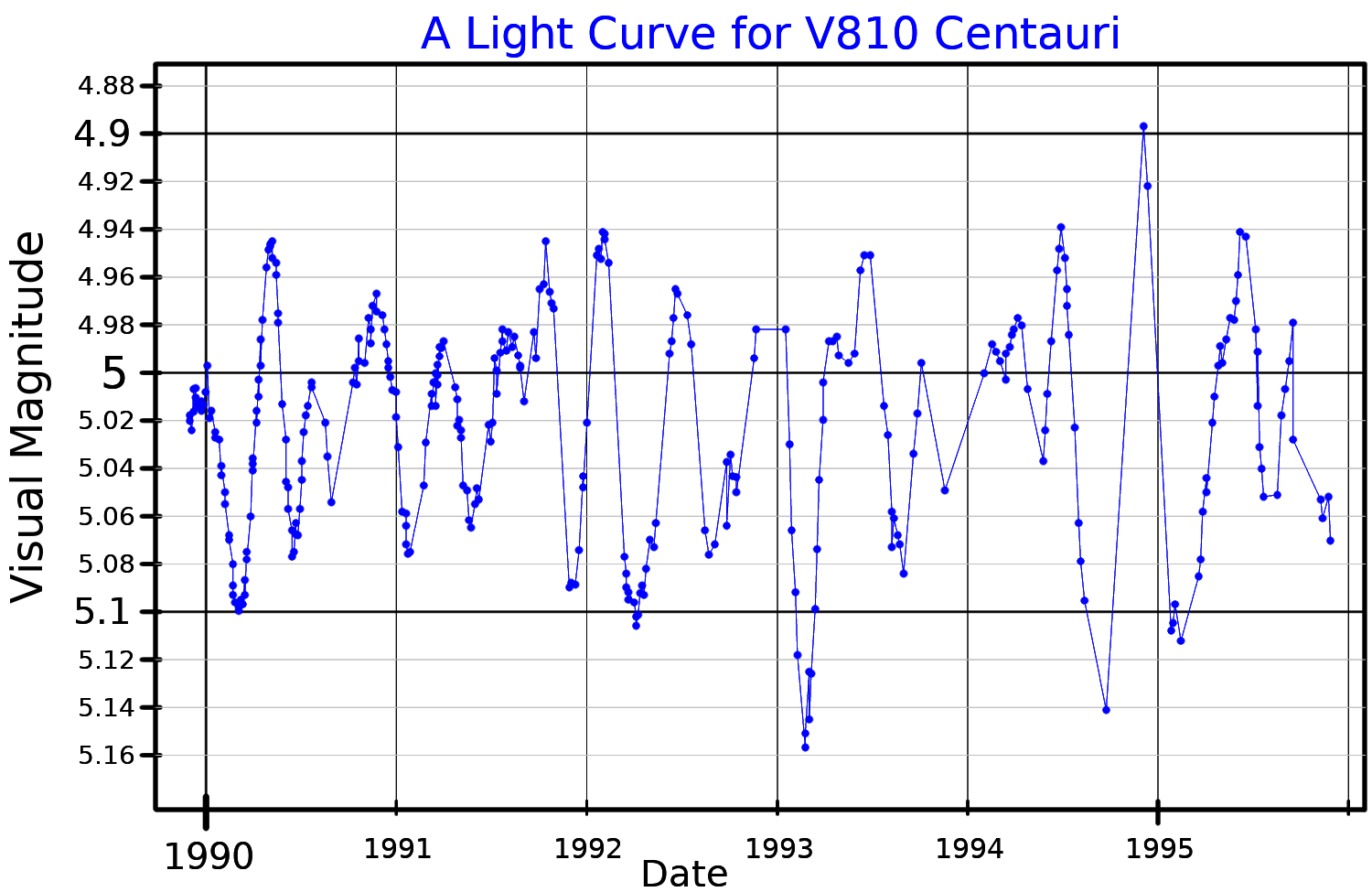
- A visual band light curve for V810 Centauri, adapted from Kienzle et al. (1998)

Observation data Epoch J2000 Equinox ICRS
- Constellation: Centaurus
- Right ascension: 11^{h} 43^{m} 31.192^{s}
- Declination: −62° 29′ 21.83″
- Apparent magnitude (V): 5.021var

Characteristics
- Spectral type: F8Ia + B0III
- U−B color index: 1.762
- B−V color index: 0.014
- Variable type: SRd

Astrometry
| Radial velocity (R_{v}) | +16.44 km/s |
| Proper motion (μ) | RA: −6.0 mas/yr Dec.: +1.3 mas/yr |
| Parallax (π) | 0.1537±0.0927 mas |
| Distance | 7,600+200 −210 ly (2,330+61 −65 pc) |
| Absolute magnitude (M_{V}) | −8.4 (A) / −5.1 (B) |

Details

V810 Cen A
| Mass | 20 M_{☉} |
| Radius | 222±20 R_{☉} |
| Luminosity | 55,000+12,700 −12,300 L_{☉} |
| Surface gravity (log g) | 0.7 cgs |
| Temperature | 5,970±100 K |

V810 Cen B
| Mass | 25 M_{☉} |
| Radius | 14 R_{☉} |
| Luminosity | 125,000 L_{☉} |
| Surface gravity (log g) | 3.5 cgs |
| Temperature | 29,000 K |

Other designations
- HIP 57175, SAO 251555, CD−61°3163, HR 4511, CPD−61°2559, HD 101947.

Database references
| SIMBAD | data |

V810 Centauri is a double star consisting of a yellow supergiant primary (V810 Cen A) and a blue giant secondary (V810 Cen B). It is a small-amplitude variable star, entirely due to the supergiant primary which is visually over three magnitudes (about 12x) brighter than the secondary. It is the MK spectral standard for class G0 0-Ia. A 5th magnitude star, it is visible to the naked eye under good observing conditions.

Maurice Pim FitzGerald announced that the star's brightness varies, in 1973. It was given its variable star designation, V810 Centauri, in 1979. V810 Cen A shows semi-regular variations with several component periods. The dominant mode is around 156 days and corresponds to Cepheid fundamental mode radial pulsation. Without the other stellar pulsation modes it would be considered a Classical Cepheid variable. Other pulsation modes have been detected at 89 to 234 days, with the strongest being a possible non-radial p-mode at 107 days and a possible non-radial g-mode at 185 days.

The blue giant secondary has a similar mass and luminosity to the supergiant primary, but is visually much fainter. The primary is expected to have lost around 5 M_{☉} since it was on the main sequence, and has expanded and cooled so it lies at the blue edge of the Cepheid instability strip. It is expected to get no cooler and may perform a blue loop while slowly increasing in luminosity.

V810 Cen is thought to be a member of the Stock 14 open cluster at 2,600 parsecs (8,500 light-years). There are indications that it might be part of another cluster at a similar distance, but most of its members appear to be over 1° away from V810 Cen. Spectroscopic and photometric estimates were consistent with a distance between 3,200 and 3,500 parsecs (10,000 and 11,000 light-years), but an analysis of the interstellar reddening exclude such high distances, indicating that the star is somewhat closer.
