= NGC 1993 =

Galaxy in the constellation Lepus

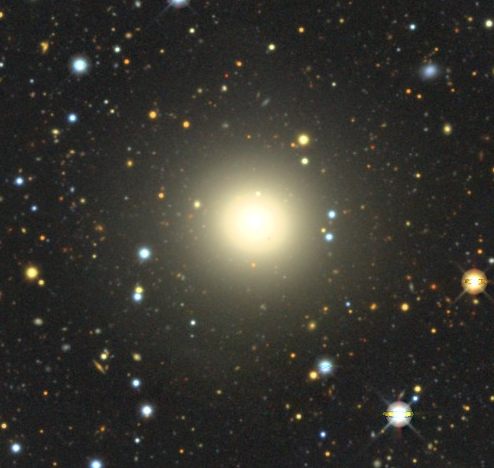
- NGC 1993 and in the far top-left from it is the ESO 544-16 galaxy

Observation data (J2000.0 epoch)
- Constellation: Lepus
- Right ascension: 05^{h} 35^{m} 25.6^{s}
- Declination: −17° 48′ 55″
- Heliocentric radial velocity: 3135
- Distance: 143 million
- Apparent magnitude (V): 13.39

Characteristics
- Type: SA0^-(rs)
- Apparent size (V): 1.5 x 1.4

Other designations
- 2MASX J05352557-1748548, MCG -03-15-003, PGC 17487, ESO 554-14, GC 1196, H 3.269

NGC 1993 (also known as ESO 554-14) is a lenticular galaxy located in the constellation Lepus. It was discovered by John Herschel on February 6, 1835. It is about 143 million light years from the Milky Way. Its apparent magnitude is 13.39 and its size is 1.5 arc minutes.

One supernova has been observed in NGC 1993: SN 2024sag (type Ia-91bg-like, mag. 18.7).
