= AK Leporis =

Star in the constellation Lepus

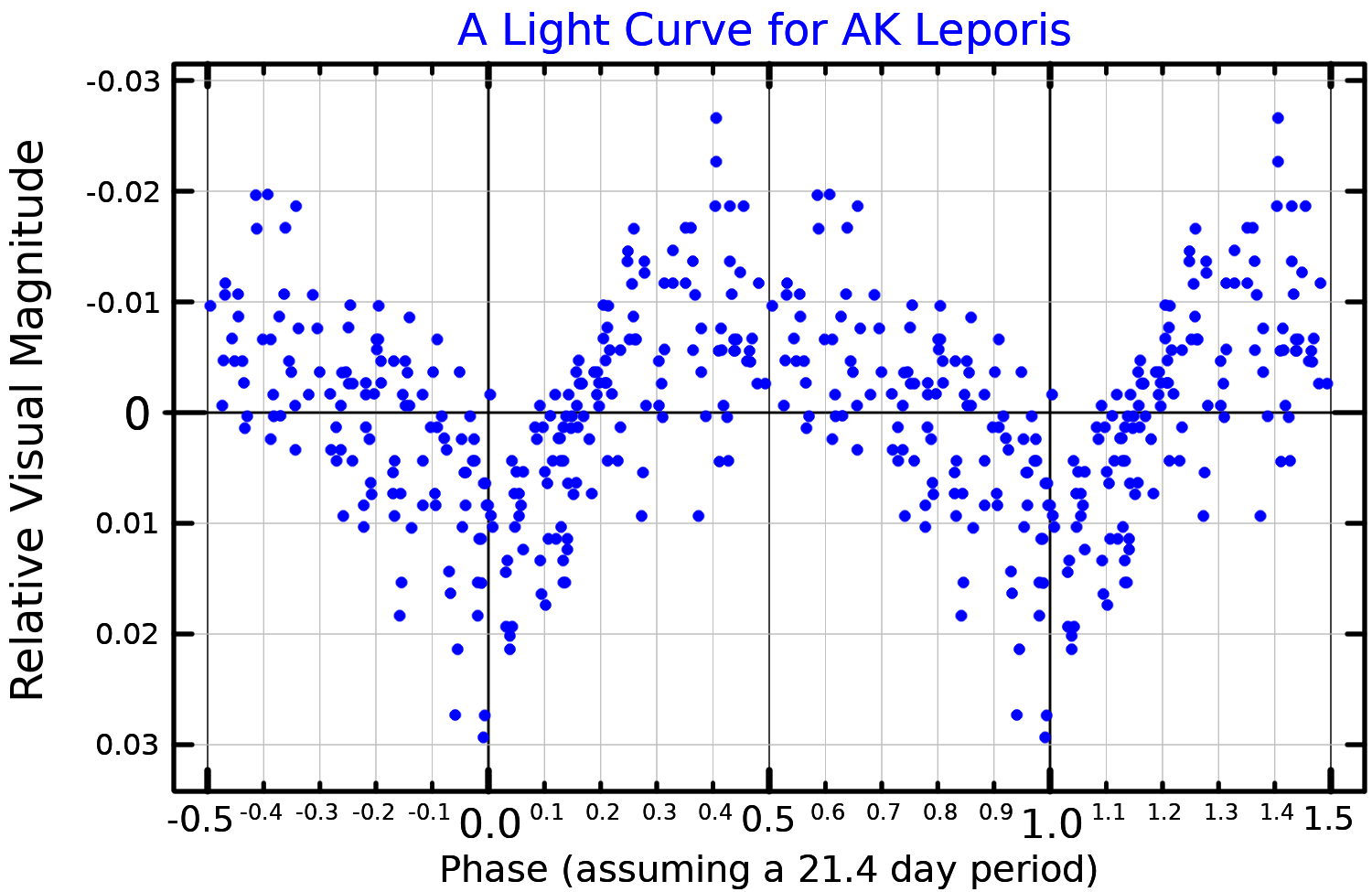
- A visual band light curve for AK Leporis, adapted from Nitschelm et al. (2000)

Observation data Epoch J2000 Equinox J2000
- Constellation: Lepus
- Right ascension: 05^{h} 44^{m} 26.537^{s}
- Declination: −22° 25′ 18.61″
- Apparent magnitude (V): 6.141

Characteristics
- Evolutionary stage: main sequence
- Spectral type: K2V
- U−B color index: +0.74
- B−V color index: +0.96
- Variable type: BY Draconis

Astrometry
Radial velocity (R_{v})	−9.80±0.12 km/s
Proper motion (μ)	RA: −304.905 mas/yr Dec.: −352.606 mas/yr
Parallax (π)	112.4661±0.0151 mas
Distance	29.000 ± 0.004 ly (8.892 ± 0.001 pc)
Absolute magnitude (M_{V})	6.31

Details
Mass	0.800+0.040 −0.048 M_{☉}
Radius	0.793±0.017 R_{☉}
Luminosity	0.300±0.005 L_{☉}
Surface gravity (log g)	4.66±0.01 cgs
Temperature	4,869±61 K
Metallicity [Fe/H]	0.01±0.06 dex
Rotation	17.3 days
Rotational velocity (v sin i)	2.8±1.8 km/s
Age	0.9 Gyr

Other designations
- γ Lep B, AK Lep, BD−22 1210, GJ 216 B, HD 38392, HR 1982, SAO 170757, LTT 2363

Database references
SIMBAD	data

AK Leporis, also known as Gamma Leporis B, is a variable star in the southern constellation of Lepus the hare. It has an apparent visual magnitude of 6.141, so, according to the Bortle scale, it is faintly visible from rural skies at night. This star forms a wide binary star system with Gamma Leporis—the two have an angular separation of 97″, making them difficult to separate with the naked eye even under the best conditions. Both Gamma Leporis and AK Leporis are members of the Ursa Major Moving Group of stars that share a common motion through space.

This is a BY Draconis variable star that undergoes slight brightness variations due to stellar activity. Differential rotation causes changes to the periodicity of the variation depending on the latitude of the activity. X-ray emission has been detected from AK Leporis, and it is located at or near a radio source.

Infrared observation of this star shows a large excess at a wavelength of 24 μm. This may be explained by the proximity of Gamma Leporis to the line of sight, or there may be a red dwarf companion or a dust disc. There is no excess observed at 70 μm.

== See also ==
- List of nearest K-type stars
