= V1027 Cygni =

Star in the constellation Cygnus

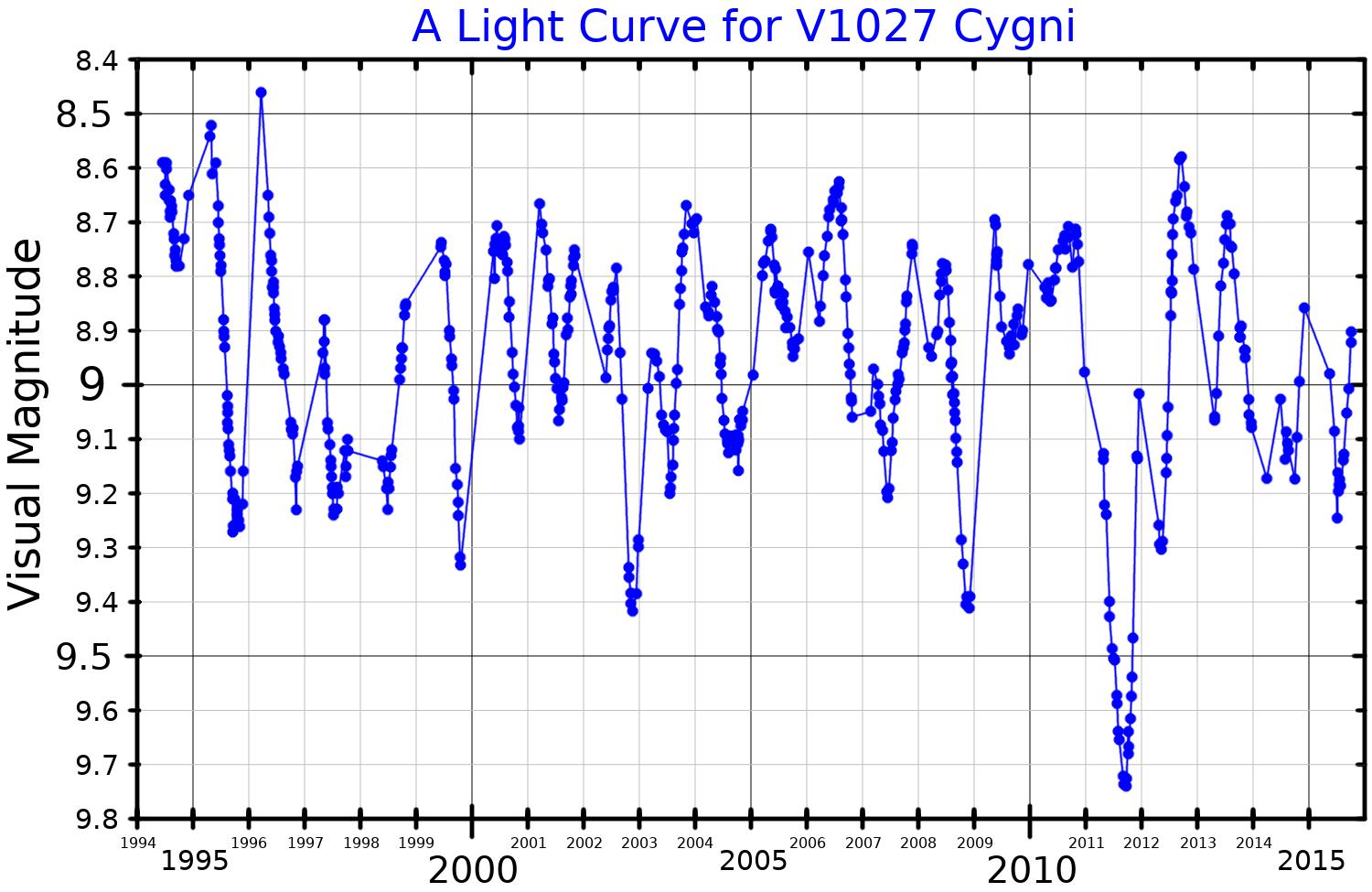
- A visual band light curve for V1027 Cygni, adapted from Arkhipova et al. (2016)

Observation data Epoch J2000 Equinox ICRS
- Constellation: Cygnus
- Right ascension: 20^{h} 02^{m} 27.376^{s}
- Declination: +30° 04′ 25.49″
- Apparent magnitude (V): 8.6-9.6

Characteristics
- Evolutionary stage: Yellow supergiant
- Spectral type: G7Ia
- U−B color index: +1.9 – +2.8
- B−V color index: +2.1 – +2.5
- Variable type: L

Astrometry
Proper motion (μ)	RA: −2.936 mas/yr Dec.: −5.55 mas/yr
Parallax (π)	0.2390±0.0178 mas
Distance	14,000 ± 1,000 ly (4,200 ± 300 pc)
Absolute magnitude (M_{V})	−7.956

Details
Mass	10.3 M_{☉}
Radius	559 (Note: Applying the Stefan–Boltzmann law with a nominal solar effective temperature of 5,772 K: $$\sqrt{(5772/5000)^4 * 176,197.605} = 559.387\ R\odot$$) R_{☉}
Luminosity	176,200 L_{☉}
Surface gravity (log g)	−0.81 cgs
Temperature	5,000 K
Metallicity [Fe/H]	−0.42 dex

Other designations
- HD 333385, TYC 2670-4475-1, 2MASS J20022738+3004252

Database references
SIMBAD	data

V1027 Cygni is a luminous yellow supergiant star located in the constellation of Cygnus, about 14,000 light years away. For a time, it was thought that it could be a low-mass post-AGB star, however recent parallax measurements published in Gaia DR3 have shown this to likely not be the case, and instead it is likely a massive yellow supergiant star.

== Properties ==
V1027 Cygni has a surface temperature about 5,000 K, which has been found in many studies. However, studies before Gaia DR3 generally used a distance around 1,280 pc, which led to low luminosity estimates, hence a tentative post-AGB star status. Recent Gaia DR3 data shows that V1027 Cygni is likely much further away, over 4,000 pc away, which implies a much higher luminosity (about 176,000 L_{☉}) which would place it firmly outside the post-AGB star luminosity range and in that of the more massive, younger yellow supergiants. Spectral indicators of luminosity also suggest a supergiant status.

Assuming a temperature of 5,000 K and a luminosity of about 176,200 L☉ for V1027 Cygni leads to a size of about 560 times that of the Sun.

== Variability ==
When V1027 Cygni was first noticed as a variable star, it was thought to be an irregular variable, dimming and brightening erratically with no discernible period. However, in 2009, a small-amplitude period of 237 days was observed in long-term photometry of the star.
