= RX Leporis =

Star in the constellation Lepus

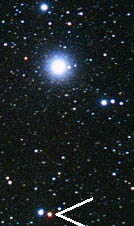
- Red giant RX Lep is 4 degrees south of Rigel

Observation data Epoch J2000 Equinox J2000
- Constellation: Lepus
- Right ascension: 05^{h} 11^{m} 22.87^{s}
- Declination: −11° 50′ 56.7″
- Apparent magnitude (V): 5.0–7.4

Characteristics
- Spectral type: M6.2III
- Variable type: Semi-regular pulsating (SRB)

Astrometry
Radial velocity (R_{v})	46.1 km/s
Parallax (π)	6.71±0.44 mas
Distance	490 ± 30 ly (149 ± 10 pc)

Details
Mass	1–4 M_{☉}
Radius	100–200 R_{☉}
Luminosity	1500–4500 L_{☉}
Temperature	3300 K

Other designations
- HD 33664, HR 1693, HIP 24169, BD−12°1092, SAO 150206

Database references
SIMBAD	data

RX Leporis (RX Lep) is a star in the constellation of Lepus. It is a red giant and is a semi-regular pulsating star.

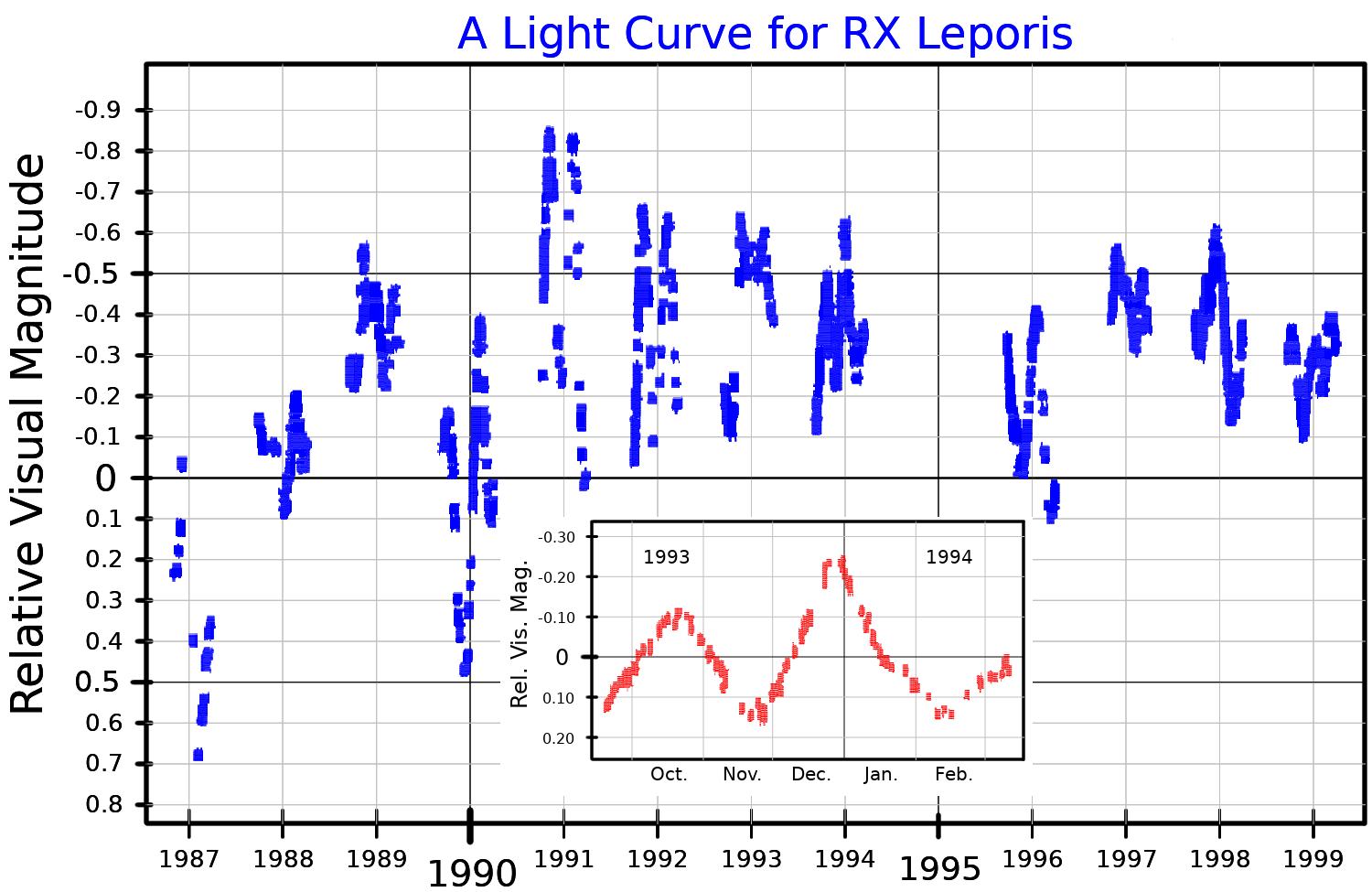
A visual band light curve for RX Leporis. The main plot shows the long-term brightness variation, and the inset plot shows the short-term variation. Adapted from Percy et al. (2001)

It has an apparent magnitude that varies from about 5.0 to 7.4. At its brightest it is dimly visible to the naked eye, and at its dimmest can be located with binoculars. In the sky it is about 4 degrees south of Rigel and is located next to Iota Leporis.

== See also ==
- List of variable stars
