= NGC 1784 =

Galaxy in the constellation Lepus

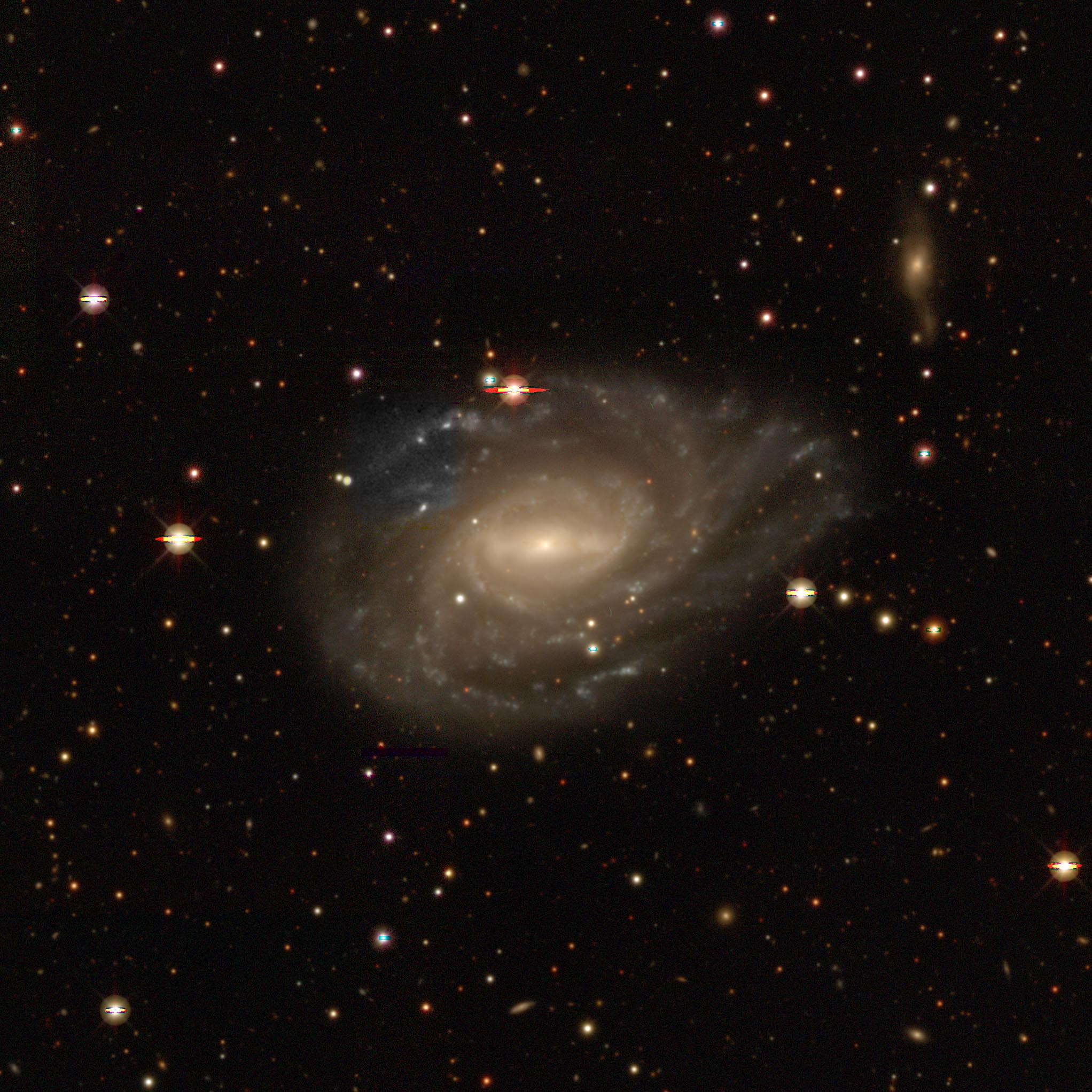
- NGC 1784 by Legacy Surveys

Observation data (J2000 epoch)
- Constellation: Lepus
- Right ascension: 05^{h} 05^{m} 27.1307^{s}
- Declination: −11° 52′ 16.766″
- Redshift: 0.007735 ± 0.000010
- Heliocentric radial velocity: 2,319 ± 3 km/s
- Distance: 79.4 ± 14.5 Mly (24.3 ± 4.4 Mpc)
- Apparent magnitude (V): 11.7

Characteristics
- Type: SB(r)c
- Size: ~103,900 ly (31.86 kpc) (estimated)
- Apparent size (V): 4.0′ × 2.5′

Other designations
- IRAS 05030-1156, MCG -02-13-042, PGC 16716

NGC 1784 is a barred spiral galaxy in the constellation Lepus. The galaxy lies about 80 million light years away from Earth based on redshift independent methods, which means, given its apparent dimensions, that NGC 1784 is approximately 100,000 light years across. Its distance based on redshift is 102 Mly. It was discovered by British astronomer John Herschel on 11 December 1836.

NGC 1784 has a strong bar with dust lanes and patches. Two spiral arms emerge from the end of the bar and form a nearly complete inner ring. The outer spiral arm of the galaxy consists of low-surface-brightness spiral fragments, which complete up to a quarter of revolution before fading. These arms have many knots. Imaging in the hydrogen line shows the presence of a narrow but bright ring. The hydrogen ring is more prominent at the eastern side of the galaxy. Also, the hydrogen appears wrapped, indicative of an interaction with another galaxy. The total hydrogen mass of the galaxy is estimated to be 1.17×10^{10} M_{☉}.

NGC 1784 is the foremost galaxy of the NGC 1784 Group, which also includes FGC 0523, and HIPASS J0508-13.

== Supernova ==
One supernova has been discovered in NGC 1784. SN 2022xkq (type Ia-91bg-like, mag. 18.9083) was discovered by Distance Less Than 40 Mpc Survey (DLT40) on 13 October 2022, and was initially classified as a type I, then reclassified as a type Ic. It was eventually classified as photometrically transitional, and spectroscopically as type Ia-91bg-like. These supernovae are characterised as underluminous and by fast-declining magnitude and are more common in older star populations. The supernova occurred in one of the spiral arms of the galaxy. An unusual feature of SN 2022xkq was its red excess. The supernova was observed by the James Webb Space Telescope in mid infrared.
