= USS Arneb =

Cargo ship of the United States Navy

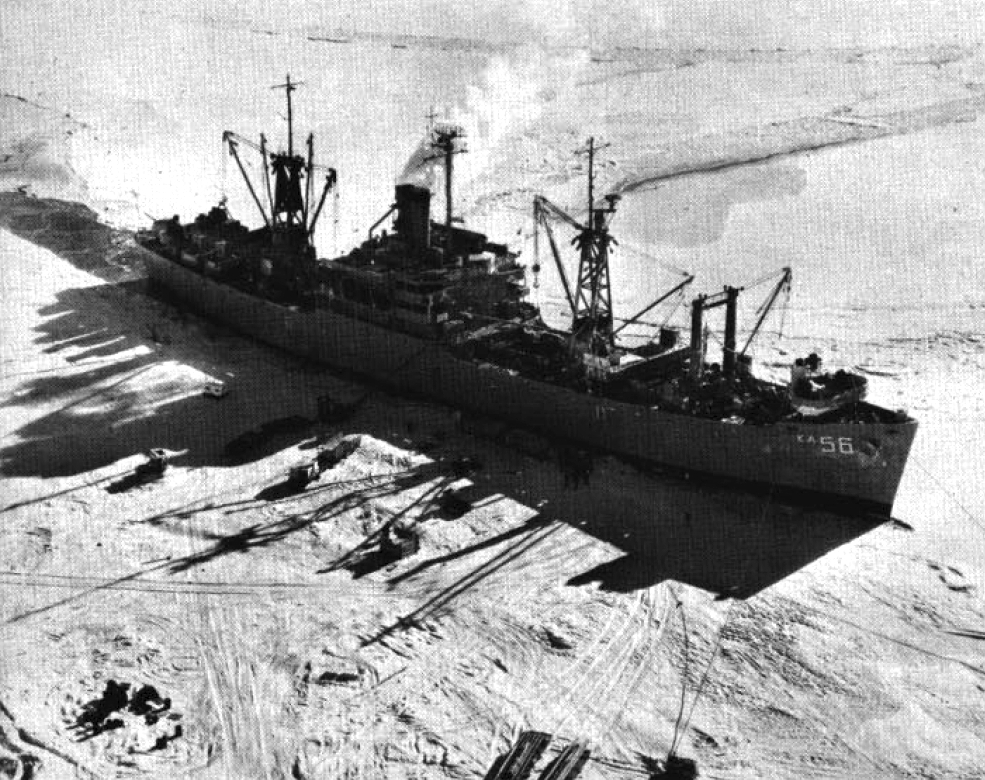
- USS Arneb (AKA-56) in Antarctica c1961

History

United States
- Name: USS Arneb
- Namesake: The star Arneb in the constellation Lepus
- Builder: Moore Dry Dock Company, Oakland, California
- Launched: 6 July 1943
- Commissioned: 22 April 1944
- Decommissioned: 16 March 1948
- Recommissioned: 19 March 1949
- Decommissioned: 12 August 1971
- Reclassified: LKA-56, 1 January 1969
- Stricken: 13 August 1971
- Honours and awards: 4 battle stars (World War II); Meritorious Unit Commendation (Apollo 7 recovery mission)
- Fate: Sold for scrap, 1 March 1973

General characteristics
- Class & type: Andromeda-class attack cargo ship
- Type: Type C2-S-B1
- Displacement: 14,200 long tons (14,428 t) full
- Length: 459 ft 2 in (139.95 m)
- Beam: 63 ft (19 m)
- Draft: 26 ft 4 in (8.03 m)
- Speed: 16.5 knots (30.6 km/h; 19.0 mph)
- Complement: 429
- Armament: 1 × 5-inch/38-caliber gun mount; 4 × twin 40 mm gun mounts; 16 × 20 mm gun mounts

USS Arneb (AKA-56/LKA-56) was an Andromeda-class attack cargo ship named after Arneb, the brightest star in the southern constellation Lepus. She served as a commissioned ship for 27 years and 3 months, the longest time in commission of any AKA.

Arneb (AKA-56) was laid down under a Maritime Commission contract (MC hull 1159) as Mischief by the Moore Dry Dock Company at Oakland, California, launched on 6 July 1943, sponsored by Mrs. Carol J. Palmer, the daughter of a plant engineer, acquired by the Navy on 16 November and towed to Portland, Oregon, where she was converted to an attack cargo ship by the Willamette Iron and Steel Works, and commissioned on 28 April 1944.

== Service history ==
=== World War II, 1944–1945 ===
Outfitted and loaded with stores for her first cruise by 10 May 1944, the attack cargo ship steamed to San Diego for shakedown training which was made unexpectedly interesting by her rescue of the three-man crew of a Navy Grumman TBF Avenger that had had to "ditch". During June and July, the ship practiced amphibious maneuvers using Army troops to make landings on San Clemente Island.

On 22 July, Arneb sailed for the Hawaiian Islands, and arrived at Pearl Harbor on 30 July. After debarking passengers, the ship continued on to Guadalcanal for training. On 29 August, the ship got underway with three transport divisions to rehearse landings for the invasion of the Palau Islands. On 8 September, she sortied with Transport Division (TransDiv) 32, and headed for Angaur Island.

The cargo ship arrived on 17 September and lowered all of her boats off the west side of the island to feign landings in that quarter in an effort to divert Japanese defensive forces. The next day, she actually landed troops and equipment of the 306th Engineers. Arneb remained in the Palaus. until 23 September, when she began carrying cargo and troops to Ulithi, Hollandia, and the Admiralty Islands.

At Manus, she fueled and loaded supplies for training and rehearsal exercises for her next operation, the liberation of the Philippines. She got underway on 12 October, arrived off Leyte on the 20th, and, despite enemy shelling, immediately began discharging, her cargo and troops. Arneb next steamed to Guam to take on more cargo and troops for delivery at Leyte on 23 November and 24 November.

Following her second voyage to Leyte, the ship steamed to Hollandia to onload provisions, cargo, and personnel as well as to receive minor repairs. Arneb departed Hollandia on 27 December to participate in the invasion of Luzon, anchoring in Lingayen Gulf on 9 January 1945. Since she was not carrying high priority cargo, her boats helped transports in landing troops and cargo on D-Day before they began unloading her own cargo on the following day. Although enemy air and small craft activity was intense, Arneb only lost one LCVP. She returned to Leyte on 15 January and ferried troops and supplies to Luzon for the assault on the area around La Paz on the 29th. During the next few weeks, the vessel took on fuel, cargo, and other supplies in Leyte Gulf in preparation for her next major task, the invasion of the Ryukyus.

On 27 March, Arneb left Leyte Gulf, arrived off Okinawa on 1 April, and unloaded supplies despite enemy air attacks. She retired to Guam and was ordered to proceed on 10 April via Pearl Harbor to the United States. The ship arrived in San Pedro on 3 May and was given a 15-day availability. Then, after loading ammunition and other supplies, she sailed for Pearl Harbor on 8 June. She returned to the west coast before the end of the month and moved into drydock at the Moore Dry Dock Co. On 20 July, the cargo ship was once again headed for the Hawaiian Islands on the first of two voyages made before the end of August. During the ship's second run to Oahu, Japan capitulated, ending the fighting in the Pacific.

While in Pearl Harbor on 28 August, Arneb received orders to load cargo and sail for the China coast to support the occupation forces. She ferried cargo and troops between Okinawa and China until 26 October, when she headed for San Francisco. Diverted to Seattle en route, she arrived there on 13 November 1945.

=== Transport duties and conversion, 1945–1949 ===
The ship was then assigned to the Naval Transport Service and made cargo runs between the west coast and the Far East until December 1947.

Placed in reserve at the Philadelphia Naval Shipyard on 16 March 1948, Arneb was modified to prepare her for polar operations. Equipped to become Rear Admiral Richard E. Byrd's flagship for a planned Antarctic cruise, she was recommissioned on 19 March 1949.

=== Atlantic and Mediterranean Fleet, 1949–1955 ===
Following shakedown training out of Guantánamo Bay in April and May, Arneb cruised in the North Atlantic from June to October to test the effectiveness of the cold weather equipment installed. After her return to Norfolk on 1 November, the ship trained in Chesapeake Bay.

Arneb, needed to supplement the 6th Fleet in the Mediterranean in early 1950, returned to the east coast in May, and underwent a three-month availability. She resumed normal training and support services for the Atlantic Fleet when the Korean War compelled postponement of the Antarctic expedition. Nevertheless, the ship utilized her cold weather gear from March to December 1951 when she rendered logistic support to naval activities in England and North Africa, including an amphibious training operation in Greenland.

Until March 1955, Arneb cruised primarily in the warm waters of the West Indies. From January to April 1952, the transport ferried cargo between islands in the West Indies. After a yard overhaul, she participated in the lengthy, large-scale NATO "Operation Mainbrace" in the North Atlantic and Mediterranean. After her return to the east coast in February 1953, Arneb made six cruises to the West Indies, before beginning preparations for an extended operation at Antarctica.

=== Polar logistic support, 1955–1964 ===
As a preliminary trial before her cruise southward, Arneb participated in an operation in waters north of the Arctic Circle along the east coast of Baffin Island in August and September and then returned to Norfolk for final outfitting. On 14 November 1955 Arneb got underway as flagship of "Operation Deep Freeze I" that would allow her to claim the distinction of crossing both the Arctic and Antarctic Circles in the course of one year. She transited the Panama Canal on 20 November, stopped at New Zealand and Franklin Island before arriving at Kainan Bay and McMurdo Sound, where she stayed from 27 December 1955 to 30 January 1956. She returned to the United States via the Indian Ocean, the Mediterranean Sea, and the Atlantic Ocean, completing her circumnavigation of the globe upon her arrival at Norfolk on 5 May 1956.

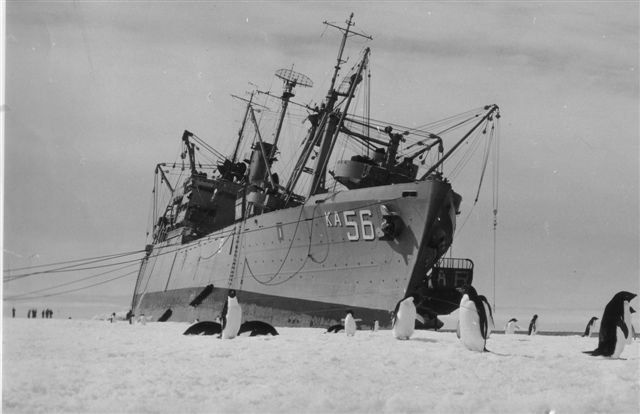
USS Arneb listing to repair ice damage to the hull in 1957.

After undergoing an overhaul from May to August and refresher training at Guantánamo Bay, Arneb was prepared for "Operation Deep Freeze II." She departed Norfolk in November; stopped at Wellington, New Zealand; entered the ice field on 16 December; and rendezvoused with the Coast Guard icebreaker USCGC Northwind (WAGB-282). Arneb experienced no difficulty in following the icebreaker during the first day of movement through the frozen sea; but, on the 18th, a quarter-inch crack – apparently caused by contact with ice during the previous two days – appeared in her hull running some 31 inches above and below the waterline. Arneb's men repaired the damage, enabling the ship to make slow but steady progress toward McMurdo Sound, where the ships arrived on Christmas Eve.

Upon completion of their work there, the two ships returned to Cape Hallett, where Arneb moored to the ice while Northwind proceeded into Moubray Bay to clear an unloading site. On the last day of 1956, the ice pack into which Arneb was nosed began to move and soon surrounded the ship with solid ice pressing against her hull. The framing on both sides of the ship began to buckle, rivets popped, seams split, and beams ripped. Frigid water and ice began flooding into several cargo holds at a combined rate of 1200 gallons per minute. Damage control parties worked doggedly to contain the inrush of water, but the men were only able to stay in the water for a few minutes at a time. Nevertheless, by using mattresses, steel plates, and shoring timbers, they managed to reduce the flow of water until the pumps could lower the water level.

On 3 January 1957, the ice pack had loosened; and enabled Northwind to lead the battered Arneb into port. After unloading the cargo, the crew repaired the cracks and split seams by listing the ship alternately to port and to starboard. Although having suffered a bent rudder post and a broken propeller blade, Arneb was able to continue the operation.

No further mishaps occurred until 30 January when Arneb, the icebreaker USS Glacier (AGB-4), and cargo ship USNS Greenville Victory (T-AK-237) attempted to push through the icepack off Knox Coast. A large chunk of ice broke off and brushed Arneb's port side, ripping a gash 12 feet long and one-half-inch wide and once again flooding the holds as well as buckling plates, popping rivets, and opening seams. The experienced damage control parties used the same techniques to patch the new wounds in her hull. The ships then got underway again, with Glacier towing Arneb. Early the next morning, they arrived at Knox Coast and once again, the damage was repaired.

Arneb left the ice fields on 17 February and steamed to Sydney, Australia, without incident. There, she went into drydock and, after minimum repairs, got underway on 28 February 1957 for the continental United States.

In spite of her troubles with ice damage, Arneb made five more cruises to Antarctica to resupply the research stations and to transport hundreds of scientists involved in research on the frozen continent. During "Deep Freeze 61" she even delivered the foundation of a nuclear power plant to McMurdo Sound. Following "Deep Freeze 63," Arneb was modified to enable her to return to normal duty with the Amphibious Force of the Atlantic Fleet.

Operation Deepfreeze 1962-63 found the Arneb stranded on Christmas Day in 8' thick pressure ice well short of McMurdo Base. The DCA reported rivet heads popping off the inside hull of the large holds containing resupply materiel. The Coast Guard icebreaker Eastwind just ahead on what days earlier had appeared to be a navigable crack in the huge ice flow pack was actually squeezed clear of the water and was resting high and almost dry on the ice. They ran emergency water supplies to the Eastwind engines. Their Exec "captured" an Adelie penguin when he was out on the ice and got his uniform drenched in penguin guano for his trouble. The USS Edisto (a "Wind-class" ice breaker) appeared late on the 26th and together with a shift in the winds, the "channel" opened up and all three ships proceeded to McMurdo, each a bit worse for wear. The Captain of the Arneb, Capt. Riffenburgh, had begun to consider abandoning ship in the grimmer hours, but fortunately Arneb and crew did not have to do what the Endurance had done fifty some years earlier.

=== Atlantic and Caribbean, 1965–1971 ===
She underwent intensive training in amphibious operations through participation in major Caribbean exercises. In 1965, she transported much-needed supplies to American forces operating in the Caribbean during the crisis in the Dominican Republic.

Arneb began a routine of operations in Atlantic and Caribbean waters and practiced with Navy and Marine Corps personnel in actual landings at Onslow Beach, N.C., and Vieques Island, Puerto Rico. During one such exercise, "LANTFLEX 66," 94 Atlantic Fleet ships took part in a three-week opposed approach, landing, and departure from Vieques under the surveillance of a Soviet intelligence-gathering trawler.

Between 8 February and 22 February 1967, Arneb was in drydock at the Bethlehem Steel Corp., in Baltimore. She then moved to the Berkeley yards of the Norfolk Shipbuilding and Drydock Co. for the remainder of her overhaul. With the overhaul completed and following refresher training during the summer of 1967, Arneb resumed her standard operating schedule of local Atlantic coast operations.

Arneb deployed to the Mediterranean in January 1968 and spent five months there as part of the 6th Fleet's Amphibious Ready Force. In August 1968, the cargo ship became the first amphibious ship and the first AKA qualified for spacecraft recovery duty, and she was on station as the secondary recovery vehicle for the Apollo 7 flight in October.

On 1 January 1969, Arneb was reclassified as an amphibious cargo ship, LKA-56. Arneb made three more Mediterranean cruises in 1969 and 1970 and participated in numerous Caribbean exercises before the Navy decided to end her naval service. Rather than inactivate and preserve the worn old ship, the Board of Inspection and Survey for the Atlantic Fleet recommended that Arneb be disposed of by sale.

=== Decommissioning and sale ===
Arneb was decommissioned at Norfolk on 12 August 1971, and her name was struck from the Navy List the following day. She was sold on 1 March 1973 to Andy International Inc. of Houston, Texas, and scrapped.

== Awards ==
Arneb received four battle stars for her World War II service, and a Meritorious Unit Commendation for the recovery mission for Apollo 7.
