= NGC 1716 =

Galaxy in the constellation Lepus

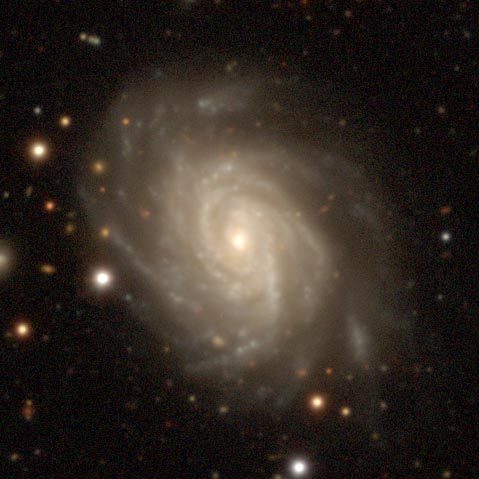
- NGC 1716 imaged by Legacy Surveys

Observation data (J2000 epoch)
- Constellation: Lepus
- Right ascension: 04^{h} 58^{m} 13.3221^{s}
- Declination: −20° 21′ 49.347″
- Redshift: 0.022742±0.0000870
- Heliocentric radial velocity: 6,818±26 km/s
- Distance: 327.7 ± 23.0 Mly (100.48 ± 7.05 Mpc)
- Apparent magnitude (V): 13.90

Characteristics
- Type: SAB(s)bc pec
- Size: ~174,500 ly (53.49 kpc) (estimated)
- Apparent size (V): 1.4′ × 1.1′

Other designations
- ESO 552- G 034, IRAS 04560-2026, MCG -03-13-038, PGC 16434

NGC 1716 is a barred spiral galaxy in the constellation of Lepus. Its velocity with respect to the cosmic microwave background is 6,813±26 km/s, which corresponds to a Hubble distance of 327.7 ± 23.0 Mly (100.48 ± 7.05 Mpc). It was discovered by British astronomer John Herschel on 11 December 1835.

NGC 1716 is a Seyfert II galaxy, i.e. it has a quasar-like nucleus with very high surface brightnesses whose spectra reveal strong, high-ionisation emission lines, but unlike quasars, the host galaxy is clearly detectable.

== Supernovae ==
Two supernovae have been observed in NGC 1716.

- SN 2020sgg (Type Ia, mag. 18.349) was discovered by ATLAS on 30 August 2020.
- SN 2024qux (Type II, mag. 18.885) was discovered by ATLAS on 1 August 2024.

== See also ==
- List of NGC objects (1001–2000)
