= IRAS 06076−2139 =

Pair of interacting galaxies

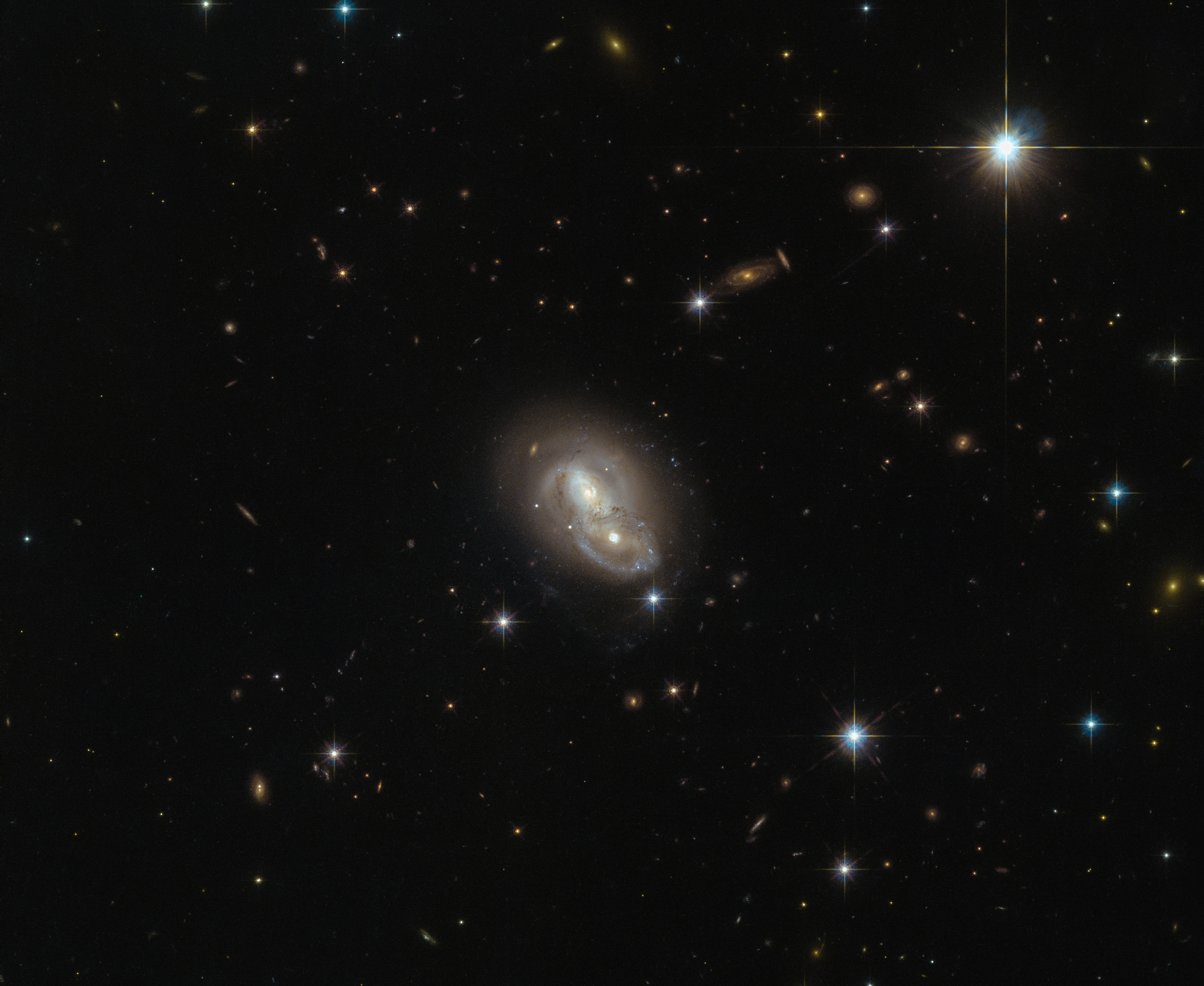
- A picture of the two interacting galaxies taken by NASA by using the Hubble Space Telescope

Observation data (J2000 epoch)
- Constellation: Lepus
- Right ascension: 06^{h} 09^{m} 45.78590^{s}
- Declination: −21° 40′ 23.6149″
- Redshift: 0.037446
- Heliocentric radial velocity: 11,226 km/s
- Distance: 538 Mly (165.0 Mpc)

Characteristics
- Type: Interacting galaxies

IRAS 06076−2139 is a pair of unusual interacting galaxies located in the constellation of Lepus about 538 million light years from Earth, making it a local universe type galaxy. The two galaxies are fairly close to each other at just 200,000 light years. These two galaxies are interacting and rushing by each other at a speed of 2 million kilometers (1,243,000 miles) per hour. Due to their speed, they are unlikely to merge with each other.
