= Nu Leporis =

Star in the constellation Lepus

- Location of ν Leporis (circled in red)

Observation data Epoch J2000.0 Equinox J2000.0 (ICRS)
- Constellation: Lepus
- Right ascension: 05^{h} 19^{m} 59.02275^{s}
- Declination: −12° 18′ 56.1139″
- Apparent magnitude (V): 5.29

Characteristics
- Spectral type: B7/8 V or B7 IVnn
- U−B color index: −0.41
- B−V color index: −0.12

Astrometry
| Radial velocity (R_{v}) | +16.0±7.4 km/s |
| Proper motion (μ) | RA: −13.32 mas/yr Dec.: +7.18 mas/yr |
| Parallax (π) | 9.78±0.37 mas |
| Distance | 330 ± 10 ly (102 ± 4 pc) |
| Absolute magnitude (M_{V}) | +0.25 |

Details
| Mass | 3.28±0.05 M_{☉} |
| Radius | 3.0 R_{☉} |
| Luminosity | 138 L_{☉} |
| Temperature | 12,417 K |
| Rotational velocity (v sin i) | 285 km/s |

Other designations
- ν Lep, 7 Lep, BD−12°1132, FK5 2380, GC 6538, HD 34863, HIP 24873, HR 1757, SAO 150345

Database references
| SIMBAD | data |

Nu Leporis, Latinized from ν Leporis, is a probable astrometric binary star system in the constellation Lepus. It is visible to the naked eye as a faint star with an apparent visual magnitude of 5.29. Based upon an annual parallax shift of 7.70 mas as seen from the Earth, it is 420 light years from the Sun.

The visible component is a B-type star with an estimated 3.3 times the mass of the Sun. Lesh (1968) gave a stellar classification of B7 IVnn, which would indicate this is a somewhat evolved subgiant star. The 'nn' notation indicates especially "nebulous" absorption lines caused by rapid rotation. Houk and Smith-Moore (1978) listed it as B7/8 V, suggesting this is instead a B-type main sequence star that has not yet consumed all the hydrogen at its core.

Nu Leporis is spinning rapidly with a projected rotational velocity of 285 km/s. The star has a radius about three times that of the Sun and is radiating 138 times the Sun's luminosity from its photosphere at an effective temperature of 12,417 K.
