= Lambda Leporis =

Star in the constellation Lepus

- Location of λ Leporis (circled in red)

Observation data Epoch J2000.0 Equinox J2000.0 (ICRS)
- Constellation: Lepus
- Right ascension: 05^{h} 19^{m} 34.52405^{s}
- Declination: −13° 10′ 36.4408″
- Apparent magnitude (V): +4.286±0.005

Characteristics
- Spectral type: B0.5 V
- U−B color index: −1.010±0.005
- B−V color index: −0.273±0.015

Astrometry
Radial velocity (R_{v})	+20.2±2.7 km/s
Proper motion (μ)	RA: −3.30 mas/yr Dec.: −4.91 mas/yr
Parallax (π)	3.83±0.24 mas
Distance	850 ± 50 ly (260 ± 20 pc)
Absolute magnitude (M_{V})	−2.77±0.15

Details
Mass	15.0±3.5 M_{☉}
Radius	4.5±0.3 R_{☉}
Luminosity	15,488 L_{☉}
Surface gravity (log g)	4.30±0.05 cgs
Temperature	30,400±300 K
Metallicity [Fe/H]	−0.15 dex
Rotational velocity (v sin i)	30±1 km/s
Age	8±2 Myr

Other designations
- λ Lep, 6 Lep, BD−13°1127, HD 34816, HIP 24845, HR 1756, SAO 150340

Database references
SIMBAD	data

Lambda Leporis, which is the Latinized form of λ Leporis, is a solitary, blue-white hued star in the southern constellation of Lepus. It is visible to the naked eye with an apparent visual magnitude of +4.29. Based upon an annual parallax shift of 3.83 mas, it is estimated to lie roughly 850 light years from the Sun. Relative to its neighbors, this star has a peculiar velocity of 16.3±2.8 km/s. It is a member of the Orion OB1 association (Ori OB1), and it has been identified as a high-velocity runaway star.

This is a massive, B-type main-sequence star with a corrected stellar classification of B0.5 V. It is an estimated eight million years old and is spinning with a projected rotational velocity of 30 km/s. This star has around 15 times the mass of the Sun and 4.5 times the Sun's radius. It is radiating 15,488 times the Sun's luminosity from its photosphere at an effective temperature of 30,400 K.
