= Alpha Leporis =

Brightest star in the constellation Lepus

α Leporis
- Location of α Leporis (circled)

Observation data Epoch J2000 Equinox ICRS
- Constellation: Lepus
- Right ascension: 05^{h} 32^{m} 43.81612^{s}
- Declination: −17° 49′ 20.2414″
- Apparent magnitude (V): 2.589

Characteristics
- Evolutionary stage: Blue loop (yellow supergiant)
- Spectral type: F0 Ib
- U−B color index: +0.386
- B−V color index: +0.2

Astrometry
Radial velocity (R_{v})	+23.9 km/s
Proper motion (μ)	RA: +3.56 mas/yr Dec.: +1.18 mas/yr
Parallax (π)	1.47±0.14 mas
Distance	2,200 ± 200 ly (680 ± 60 pc)
Absolute magnitude (M_{V})	−5.28

Details
Mass	12–13 M_{☉}
Radius	74 – 105+15 −21 R_{☉}
Luminosity	27,000 L_{☉}
Surface gravity (log g)	1.34±0.07 cgs
Temperature	7,253 or 7,290 K
Metallicity [Fe/H]	+0.01–0.06 dex
Rotational velocity (v sin i)	13–21 km/s
Age	13 Myr

Other designations
- Arneb, 11 Leporis, BD−17°1166, FK5 207, HD 36673, HIP 25985, HR 1865, SAO 150547

Database references
SIMBAD	data

Alpha Leporis (α Leporis, abbreviated Alpha Lep, α Lep), formally named Arneb /ˈɑːrnɛb/, is the brightest star in the constellation of Lepus.

== Nomenclature ==
Alpha Leporis is the star's Bayer designation. The traditional name Arneb comes from the Arabic أرنب ’arnab 'hare' ('Lepus' is Latin for hare). In 2016, the International Astronomical Union organized a Working Group on Star Names (WGSN) to catalog and standardize proper names for stars. The WGSN's first bulletin of July 2016 included a table of the first two batches of names approved by the WGSN; which included Arneb for this star.

In Chinese, 廁 (Cè), meaning Toilet, refers to an asterism consisting of α Leporis, β Leporis, γ Leporis and δ Leporis. Consequently, the Chinese name for α Leporis itself is 廁一 (Cè yī), "the First Star of Toilet".

== Properties ==
Alpha Leporis has a stellar classification of F0 Ib, with the Ib luminosity class indicating that it is a lower luminosity yellow supergiant star. Since 1943, the spectrum of this star has served as one of the stable anchor points by which other stars are classified.

This is a massive star with about 12 to 13 times the mass of the Sun and 105 times the Sun's radius. The effective temperature of the outer envelope is about 7,300 K, which gives the star a yellowish-white hue that is typical of F-type stars. It is an estimated 13 million years old. A weak magnetic field was detected around the star. If Arneb was placed in the center of the Solar System, its surface would extend beyond the orbit of Mercury.

Arneb is an older, dying star that has already passed through a red supergiant phase and is now contracting and heating up in the latter phases of stellar evolution, in a blue loop.

== Namesakes ==
USS Arneb (AKA-56) was a ship of the United States Navy.

In the light novel series Re:Zero, the character Rui Arneb is named after the star.
