= Beta Leporis =

Second brightest star in the constellation Lepus

β Leporis
- Location of β Leporis (circled)

Observation data Epoch J2000.0 Equinox J2000.0 (ICRS)
- Constellation: Lepus
- Right ascension: 05^{h} 28^{m} 14.72316^{s}
- Declination: −20° 45′ 33.9878″
- Apparent magnitude (V): 2.84

Characteristics
- Spectral type: G5 II
- U−B color index: +0.47
- B−V color index: +0.82
- R−I color index: +0.44

Astrometry
Radial velocity (R_{v})	−13.6 ± 0.9 km/s
Proper motion (μ)	RA: −5.02 mas/yr Dec.: −85.92 mas/yr
Parallax (π)	20.34±0.18 mas
Distance	160 ± 1 ly (49.2 ± 0.4 pc)
Absolute magnitude (M_{V})	−0.65

Details
Mass	3.5 ± 0.1 M_{☉}
Radius	15.9 R_{☉}
Luminosity	160±3 L_{☉}
Surface gravity (log g)	2.60 ± 0.03 cgs
Temperature	5,434±38 K
Metallicity [Fe/H]	−0.12±0.06 dex
Rotational velocity (v sin i)	11 km/s
Age	240 Myr

Other designations
- Nihal, β Lep, Beta Leporis, Beta Lep, 9 Leporis, 9 Lep, BD−20 1096, FK5 204, GC 6762, HD 36079, HIP 25606, HR 1829, PPM 248938, SAO 170457, WDS 05282-2046A.

Database references
SIMBAD	data

Beta Leporis (β Leporis, abbreviated Beta Lep, β Lep), formally named Nihal /ˈnaɪ.æl/, is the second brightest star in the constellation of Lepus.

== Nomenclature ==
Beta Leporis is the star's Bayer designation. It is also known by the traditional named Nihal, Arabic for "quenching their thirst". The occasional spelling Nibal appears to be due to a misreading. In 2016, the International Astronomical Union organized a Working Group on Star Names (WGSN) to catalog and standardize proper names for stars. The WGSN's first bulletin of July 2016 included a table of the first two batches of names approved by the WGSN; which included Nihal for this star.

In Chinese, 廁 (Cè), meaning Toilet, refers to an asterism consisting of β Leporis, α Leporis, γ Leporis and δ Leporis. Consequently, the Chinese name for β Leporis itself is 廁二 (Cè èr), "the Second Star of Toilet".

== Properties ==
Based on parallax measurements from the Hipparcos astrometry satellite, this star is located about 160 light-years (49 parsecs) from the Earth. It has an apparent visual magnitude of 2.84 and a stellar classification of G5 II. The mass of this star is 3.5 times the mass of the Sun and it is about 240 million years old, which is the sufficient time for a star this massive to consume the hydrogen at its core and evolve away from the main sequence, becoming a G-type bright giant. The angular diameter of Beta Leporis, after correction for limb darkening, is 3.003±0.066 mas. At the distance to this star, it yield a physical radius of 15.9 times the radius of the Sun.

This is a double star system and may be a binary, whereby the second star has a brightness of 7.34 mag. Using adaptive optics on the AEOS telescope at Haleakala Observatory, the pair was found to be separated by an angle of 2.58 arcseconds at a position angle of 1.4°. Component B has been observed to fluctuate in brightness and is catalogued as suspected variable star NSV 2008.
