= Gamma Leporis =

Star in the constellation Lepus

γ Leporis
- Location of γ Leporis (circled)

Observation data Epoch J2000 Equinox ICRS
- Constellation: Lepus
- Right ascension: 05^{h} 44^{m} 27.79062^{s}
- Declination: −22° 26′ 54.1878″
- Apparent magnitude (V): 3.587

Characteristics
- Evolutionary stage: main sequence
- Spectral type: F6 V
- U−B color index: −0.007
- B−V color index: +0.494

Astrometry
Radial velocity (R_{v})	−8.99±0.15 km/s
Proper motion (μ)	RA: −291.757 mas/yr Dec.: −368.521 mas/yr
Parallax (π)	112.2960±0.1452 mas
Distance	29.04 ± 0.04 ly (8.91 ± 0.01 pc)
Absolute magnitude (M_{V})	3.84

Details
Mass	1.17+0.10 −0.06 M_{☉}
Radius	1.30±0.03 R_{☉}
Luminosity (bolometric)	2.36+0.13 −0.14 L_{☉}
Surface gravity (log g)	4.350±0.040 cgs
Temperature	6,276+57 −61 K
Metallicity [Fe/H]	−0.12 dex
Rotation	5.91±0.66 days
Rotational velocity (v sin i)	15 km/s
Age	1.3 Gyr

Other designations
- γ Lep, 13 Leporis, BD−22°1211, CD−22°2438, FK5 217, GJ 216 A, HD 38393, HIP 27072, HR 1983, SAO 170759

Database references
SIMBAD	data

Gamma Leporis, Latinized from γ Leporis, is a star in the southern half of the constellation Lepus, southeast of Beta Leporis and southwest of Delta Leporis. With an apparent visual magnitude of 3.587, it is bright enough to be seen with the naked eye. Based upon an annual parallax shift of 112.3 mas as seen from Earth, its distance can be calculated as 29.04 light-years. It has a common proper motion companion, AK Leporis (or Gamma Leporis B), which is a variable star of the BY Draconis type and has an average brightness of magnitude 6.28. The two are 95″ apart can be well seen in binoculars. Gamma Leporis is a member of the Ursa Major Moving Group.

Gamma Leporis is an F-type main-sequence star with a stellar classification of F6 V. It is larger than the Sun with 1.30 times the radius of the Sun and 1.17 times the Sun's mass. The star is around 1.3 billion years old and is spinning with a rotation period of about six days. Based upon its stellar characteristics and distance from Earth, Gamma Leporis was considered a high-priority target for NASA's Terrestrial Planet Finder mission. It has been examined for an infrared excess, but none has been observed.

A 1971 NASA catalog of named stars listed this star as Kursi al Jabbar, from the Arabic Al Kursiyy al Jabbār "the footstool of the giant [Orion]", which referred to the asterism formed by Alpha, Beta, Gamma, and Delta Leporis.

Van Biesbroeck's star catalog of 1961 lists the red dwarf star VB 1 as a companion of Gamma Leporis, but this is a background star that is not physically associated. It should not be confused with AK Leporis (Gamma Leporis B), which is a true companion star.

== See also ==
- List of star systems within 25–30 light-years
- List of nearest F-type stars
