= Kappa Leporis =

Star in the constellation Lepus

- Location of κ Leporis (circled in red)

Observation data Epoch J2000.0 Equinox J2000.0 (ICRS)
- Constellation: Lepus
- Right ascension: 05^{h} 13^{m} 13.87761^{s}
- Declination: −12° 56′ 28.6463″
- Apparent magnitude (V): 4.43 + 7.00

Characteristics
- Spectral type: B9 V
- U−B color index: −0.34
- B−V color index: −0.10

Astrometry
Radial velocity (R_{v})	+20.8±1.0 km/s
Proper motion (μ)	RA: −12.29 mas/yr Dec.: −0.79 mas/yr
Parallax (π)	4.48±0.58 mas
Distance	approx. 730 ly (approx. 220 pc)
Absolute magnitude (M_{V})	−2.34

Details

κ Lep A
Mass	4.86±0.39 M_{☉}
Radius	2.6 R_{☉}
Luminosity	1,346 L_{☉}
Surface gravity (log g)	3.44 cgs
Temperature	11,588 K
Metallicity [Fe/H]	−0.07 dex
Rotational velocity (v sin i)	135 km/s

Other designations
- κ Lep, 4 Lep, BD−13°1092, GC 6387, HD 33949, HIP 24327, HR 1705, SAO 150239, CCDM J05132-1256AB

Database references
SIMBAD	data

Kappa Leporis, Latinized from κ Leporis, is a binary star system in the southern constellation of Lepus. The pair have apparent visual magnitudes of 4.43 and 7.00, with the former being bright enough to be seen with the naked eye. As of 2000, they had an angular separation of 2.179 arc seconds along a position angle of 357.3°. Based upon an annual parallax shift of 4.48 mas as measured from Earth, the system is located roughly 730 light years from the Sun. The system is travelling away from the Sun with a radial velocity of +20.8 km/s.

The brighter, blue-white hued member of the system, component A, is a B-type main-sequence star with a stellar classification of B9 V. It has nearly five times the mass of the Sun and around 2.6 times the Sun's radius. The star is radiating 1,346 times the Sun's luminosity from its photosphere at an effective temperature of 11,588 K. It displays an infrared excess at a wavelength of 12μm, making it a candidate host for a circumstellar debris disk.
