= Iota Leporis =

Star in the constellation Lepus

- Location of ι Leporis (circled in red)

Observation data Epoch J2000.0 Equinox J2000.0 (ICRS)
- Constellation: Lepus
- Right ascension: 05^{h} 12^{m} 17.90190^{s}
- Declination: −11° 52′ 09.1863″
- Apparent magnitude (V): 4.45

Characteristics
- Spectral type: B7.5 Vn + K7.2 XR? + G8 Ve
- U−B color index: −0.40
- B−V color index: −0.10

Astrometry
| Radial velocity (R_{v}) | +23.50 km/s |
| Proper motion (μ) | RA: +24.39 mas/yr Dec.: −31.02 mas/yr |
| Parallax (π) | 14.07±0.16 mas |
| Distance | 232 ± 3 ly (71.1 ± 0.8 pc) |
| Absolute magnitude (M_{V}) | 0.01 |

Details

ι Lep A
| Mass | 3.37±0.02 M_{☉} |
| Luminosity | 153 L_{☉} |
| Surface gravity (log g) | 4.25 cgs |
| Temperature | 13,781±469 K |
| Rotational velocity (v sin i) | 185 km/s |
| Age | 94 Myr |

Other designations
- ι Lep, 3 Lep, BD−12°1095, GC 6374, HD 33802, HIP 24244, HR 1696, SAO 150223, CCDM J05123-1152A, WDS J05123-1152A

Database references
| SIMBAD | data |

Iota Leporis (ι Leporis) is a triple star system in the southern constellation of Lepus. It is visible to the naked eye as a point source of blue-white light with an apparent visual magnitude of 4.45. Based upon an annual parallax shift of 14.07 mas as measured from Earth, the system is located roughly 232 light years from the Sun.

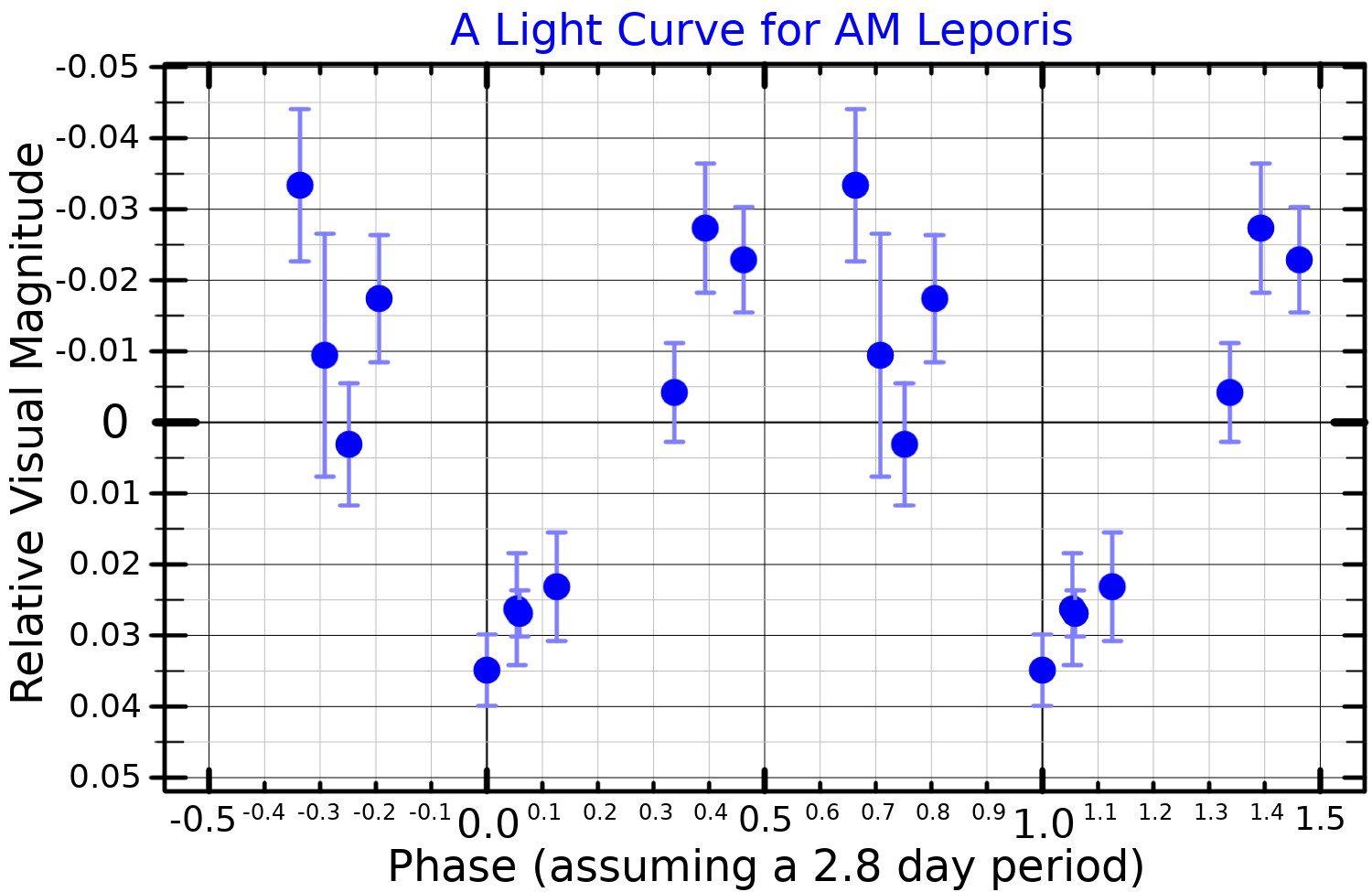
A light curve for AM Leporis, adapted from Huélamo et al. (2004)

The primary, designated component A, is a B-type main-sequence star with a stellar classification of B7.5 Vn, where the 'n' suffix indicates "nebulous" absorption lines caused by rotation. It is about 94 million years old and has a high rate of spin with a projected rotational velocity of 185 km/s. With an estimated 3.4 times the mass of the Sun, it is radiating 153 times the Sun's luminosity from its photosphere at an effective temperature of around 13,781 K.

There is a close companion that is a source of X-ray emission. Most likely this star has at least 1.05 times the mass of the Sun. The third component, AM Leporis, is a BY Draconis variable of apparent magnitude 9.92, and spectral type G8Ve at an angular separation of 12.7".
