= W Virginis =

Variable star in the constellation Virgo

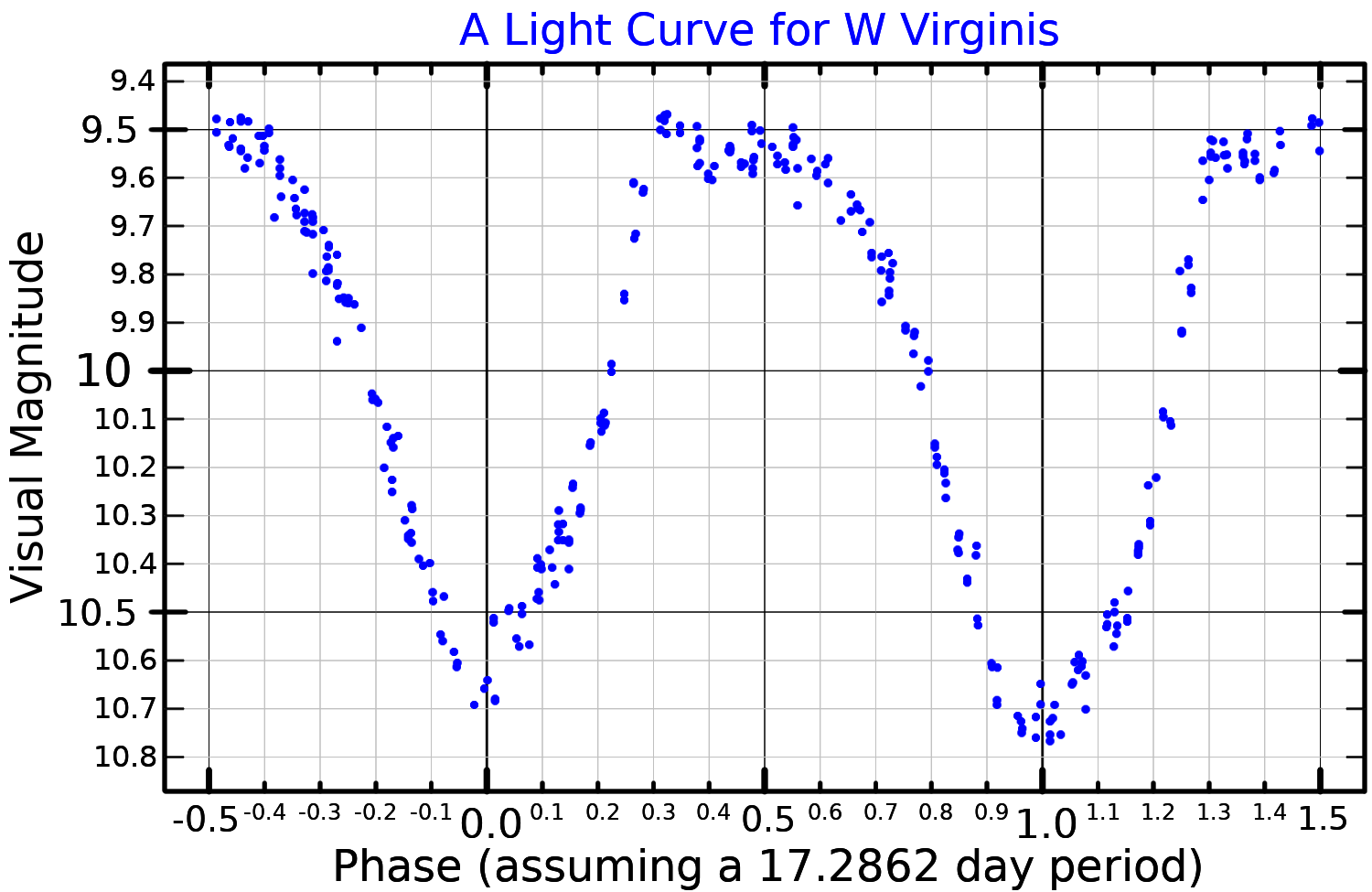
- A visual band light curve for W Virginis, adapted from Plachy et al. (2017)

Observation data Epoch J2000 Equinox ICRS
- Constellation: Virgo
- Right ascension: 13^{h} 26^{m} 01.99288^{s}
- Declination: −03° 22′ 43.4311″
- Apparent magnitude (V): 9.46 - 10.75

Characteristics
- Spectral type: F0Ib-G0Ib
- B−V color index: +0.40 (+0.43 - +0.99)
- Variable type: W Virginis

Astrometry
Radial velocity (R_{v})	−65.5 km/s
Proper motion (μ)	RA: −4.007±0.022 mas/yr Dec.: +1.105±0.012 mas/yr
Parallax (π)	0.4728±0.0222 mas
Distance	6,900 ± 300 ly (2,120 ± 100 pc)

Details
Mass	0.4 M_{☉}
Radius	35 (22 - 52) R_{☉}
Luminosity	851 (474 - 1,247) L_{☉}
Surface gravity (log g)	0.0 cgs
Temperature	4,280 - 6,550 K
Metallicity	−1.0

Other designations
- HIP 65531, SAO 139335, BD−02°3683, HD 116802

Database references
SIMBAD	data

W Virginis is the prototype W Virginis variable, a subclass of the Cepheid variable stars. It is located in the constellation Virgo, and varies between magnitudes 9.46 and 10.75 over a period of approximately 17 days. The star was discovered by Eduard Schönfeld in 1866.

There are variations in the light curve apparently due to multiple pulsation periods rather than inherent instabilities in the pulsation. The dominant pulsation mode has a period of 17.27134 days with a period decrease detected over a 75-year period.

The pulsations cause changes in both temperature and size, leading to large changes in the luminosity and brightness. The maximum temperature occurs when the star is at its brightest visually, when the star is also at its smallest. The minimum temperature and maximum radius occur at around phase 0.5 when the brightness is decreasing and nearly at minimum. Because relatively more infrared radiation is produced when the star is cooler, the maximum brightness in the infrared occurs when the visual brightness is already decreasing, and the maximum bolometric luminosity occurs at around phase 0.25 around halfway from maximum to minimum visual brightness.

W Virginis stars are old helium shell burning stars with masses less than the sun. They have supergiant spectral luminosity classes despite their modest masses and actual luminosities, because they are highly inflated evolved stars with very low surface gravities. W Virginis itself is typical, with a mass less than half the sun, pulsating between 20 and 50 times the sun's radius, and a luminosity that varies from less than 500 L_{☉} to over a thousand L_{☉}.
