= W Virginis variable =

Type of variable stars

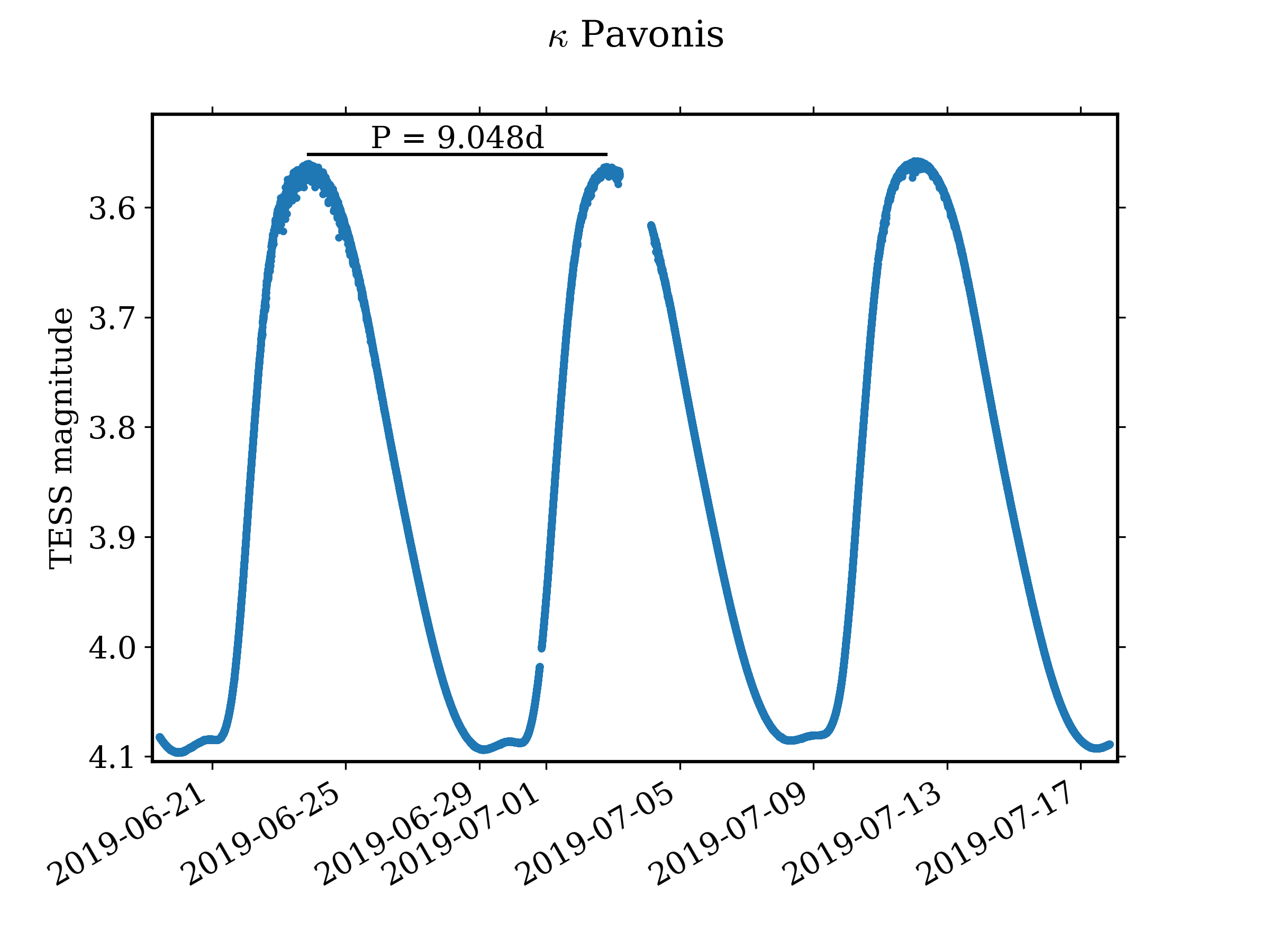
Lightcurve of the W Virginis (Type II Cepheid) variable κ Pavonis recorded by NASA's Transiting Exoplanet Survey Satellite (TESS).

W Virginis variables are a subclass of Type II Cepheids which exhibit pulsation periods between 10–20 days, and are of spectral class F6 – K2.

They were first recognized as being distinct from classical Cepheids by Walter Baade in 1942, in a study of Cepheids in the Andromeda Galaxy that proposed that stars in that galaxy were of two populations. The Type II Cepheids are now split into three sub-groups, with the W Virginis group being asymptotic giant branch stars which have temporarily increased in temperature due to a helium shell flash and crossed the instability strip. The prototype is W Virginis.

== See also ==
- Low-dimensional chaos in stellar pulsations
