= Delta Leporis =

Star in the constellation Lepus

- Location of δ Leporis (circled in red)

Observation data Epoch J2000.0 Equinox J2000.0 (ICRS)
- Constellation: Lepus
- Right ascension: 05^{h} 51^{m} 19.29613^{s}
- Declination: −20° 52′ 44.7232″
- Apparent magnitude (V): 3.85

Characteristics
- Spectral type: K1 IV Fe−0.5 or K0 IIIb Fe−1.5 CH0.5
- U−B color index: +0.71
- B−V color index: +0.98

Astrometry
Radial velocity (R_{v})	+100.20 km/s
Proper motion (μ)	RA: +229.49 mas/yr Dec.: −648.41 mas/yr
Parallax (π)	28.68±0.17 mas
Distance	113.7 ± 0.7 ly (34.9 ± 0.2 pc)
Absolute magnitude (M_{V})	+1.04

Details
Mass	0.94 M_{☉}
Radius	10.01±0.43 R_{☉}
Luminosity	45.7 L_{☉}
Surface gravity (log g)	2.41±0.10 cgs
Temperature	4,684±80 K
Metallicity [Fe/H]	−0.68±0.08 dex
Rotational velocity (v sin i)	0 km/s
Age	10.7 Gyr

Other designations
- δ Lep, 15 Lep, BD−20°1211, FK5 222, GC 7362, HD 39364, HIP 27654, HR 2035, SAO 170926, LHS 1792

Database references
SIMBAD	data

Delta Leporis which is latinized from δ Leporis is a solitary, orange-hued star in the southern constellation of Lepus. It is visible to the naked eye with an apparent visual magnitude of 3.85. Based upon an annual parallax shift of 28.68 mas, it is 114 light years distant from Earth.

This is an old, evolved K-type star with an age of about 10.7 billion years. Keenan and McNeil (1989) classified it as K0 IIIb Fe−1.5 CH0.5, indicating it is a giant star showing a deficiency of iron and an excess of cyanogen in its atmosphere. However, Gray et al. (2006) listed it as K1 IV Fe−0.5, which would suggest a less evolved subgiant star. It may be a red clump star, which indicates it is generating energy through helium fusion at its core.

It has 94% of the Sun's mass, but a radius 10 times wider. It is radiating 46 times the Sun's luminosity from its photosphere at an effective temperature of 4,660 K. It is a Population II star.
