= Lepus (constellation) =

Constellation in the southern celestial hemisphere

- Constellation
- List of stars in Lepus
- Abbreviation: Lep
- Genitive: Leporis
- Pronunciation: /ˈliːpəs/, or colloquially /ˈlɛpəs/; genitive /ˈlɛpərɪs/
- Symbolism: the Hare
- Right ascension: 04^{h} 55^{m} 02.2311^{s}–06^{h} 12^{m} 51.7500^{s}
- Declination: −10.8138046°–−27.2787991°
- Quadrant: NQ2
- Area: 290 sq. deg. (51st)
- Main stars: 8
- Bayer/Flamsteed stars: 20
- Stars brighter than 3.00^{m}: 2
- Stars within 10.00 pc (32.62 ly): 3
- Brightest star: α Lep (Arneb) (2.58^{m})
- Nearest star: Gliese 229
- Messier objects: 1
- Meteor showers: None
- Bordering constellations: Orion; Monoceros; Canis Major; Columba; Caelum; Eridanus
- Visible at latitudes between +63° and −90°. Best visible at 21:00 (9 p.m.) during the month of January.

Lepus is a constellation lying just south of the celestial equator. Its name is Latin for hare. It is located below—immediately south—of Orion (the hunter), and is sometimes represented as a hare being chased by Orion or by Orion's hunting dogs.

Although the hare does not represent any particular figure in Greek mythology, Lepus was one of the 48 constellations listed by the 2nd-century astronomer Ptolemy, and it remains one of the 88 modern constellations.

== History and mythology ==
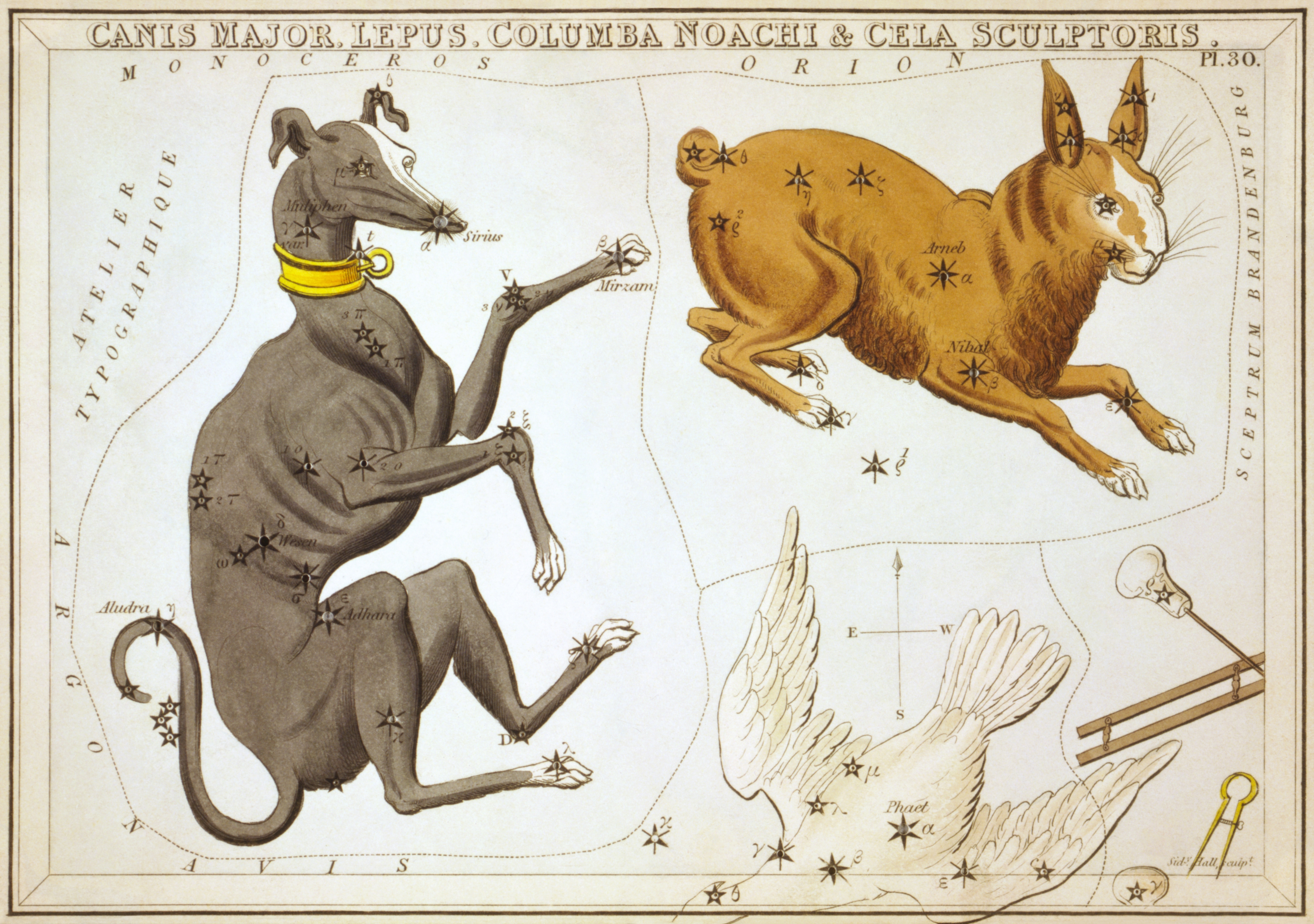
Lepus as seen in Urania's Mirror (1825)

Lepus is most often represented as a hare being hunted by Orion, whose hunting dogs (Canis Major and Canis Minor) pursue it. The constellation is also associated with the Moon rabbit.

Four stars of this constellation (α, β, γ, δ Lep) form a quadrilateral and are known as ‘Arsh al-Jawzā', "the Throne of Jawzā'" or Kursiyy al-Jawzā' al-Mu'akhkhar, "the Hindmost Chair of Jawzā'" and al-Nihāl, "the Camels Quenching Their Thirst" in Arabic.

== Features ==
=== Stars ===
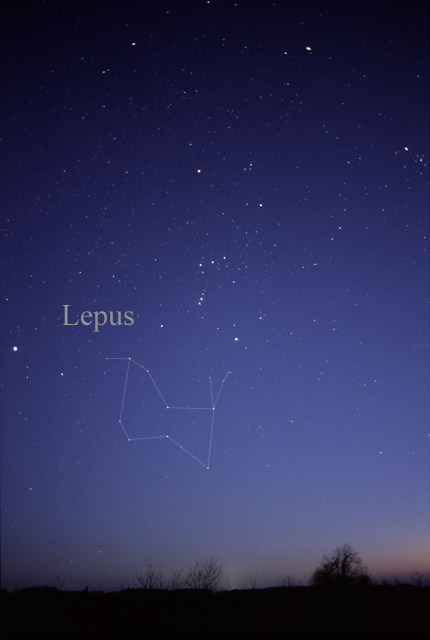
The constellation Lepus as it can be seen by the naked eye

There are a fair number of bright stars, both single and double, in Lepus. Alpha Leporis, the brightest star of Lepus, is a white supergiant of magnitude 2.6, 1300 light-years from Earth. Its traditional name, Arneb (أرنب ’arnab), means "hare" in Arabic. Beta Leporis, traditionally known as Nihal (Arabic for "quenching their thirst"), is a yellow giant of magnitude 2.8, 159 light-years from Earth. Gamma Leporis is a double star divisible in binoculars. The primary is a yellow star of magnitude 3.6, 29 light-years from Earth. The secondary is an orange star of magnitude 6.2. Delta Leporis is a yellow giant of magnitude 3.8, 112 light-years from Earth. Epsilon Leporis is an orange giant of magnitude 3.2, 227 light-years from Earth. Kappa Leporis is a double star divisible in medium aperture amateur telescopes, 560 light-years from Earth. The primary is a blue-white star of magnitude 4.4 and the secondary is a star of magnitude 7.4.

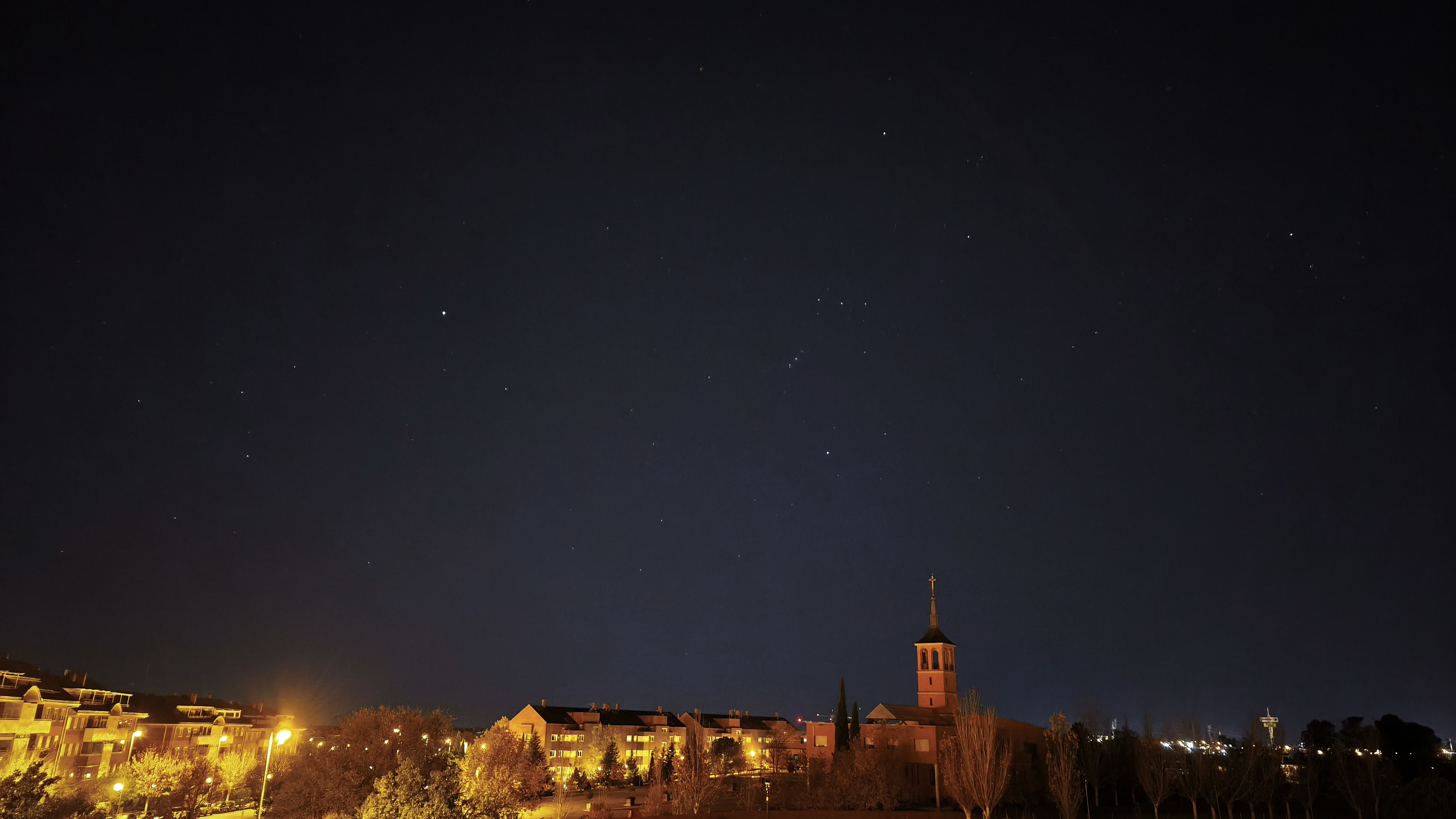
Lepus, Canis Major and Orion constellations

There are several variable stars in Lepus. R Leporis is a Mira variable star. It is also called "Hind's Crimson Star" for its striking red color and because it was named for John Russell Hind. It varies in magnitude from a minimum of 9.8 to a maximum of 7.3, with a period of 420 days. R Leporis is at a distance of 1500 light-years. The color intensifies as the star brightens. It can be as dim as magnitude 12 and as bright as magnitude 5.5. T Leporis is also a Mira variable observed in detail by ESO's Very Large Telescope Interferometer. RX Leporis is a semi-regular red giant that has a period of 2 months. It has a minimum magnitude of 7.4 and a maximum magnitude of 5.0.

=== Deep-sky objects ===
There is one Messier object in Lepus, M79. It is a globular cluster of magnitude 8.0, 42,000 light-years from Earth. One of the few globular clusters visible in the Northern Celestial Hemisphere's winter, it is a Shapley class V cluster, which means that it has an intermediate concentration towards its center. It is often described as having a "starfish" shape.

M79 was discovered in 1780 by Pierre Méchain.

== See also ==
- Lepus (Chinese astronomy)
- List of star names in Lepus
