= List of terrestrial exoplanet candidates for atmosphere detection =

Rocky exoplanets are thought to be abundant in the Milky Way, however the existence and composition of their atmospheres are generally unknown. The existence of a stable atmosphere depends on several factors, including the total amount of radiation received (which is related to the spectral type of the host star), the surface gravity (related to mass and radius), and the orbital period.

In 2024, 55 Cancri Ae became the first terrestrial exoplanet to have its atmosphere detected with high confidence. Its atmosphere might have been re-generated by a magma ocean, and is composed of either carbon monoxide (CO) or carbon dioxide (CO_{2}). (Note: A study suggested that its atmosphere contains phosphorus monoxide and carbon dioxide in nitrogen-gas background instead) Later studies found evidences of atmosphere for the sub-Earth planet L 98-59 b, the evaporating planet K2-22b, and the super-Earth planets TOI-561 b and HD 3167 b.

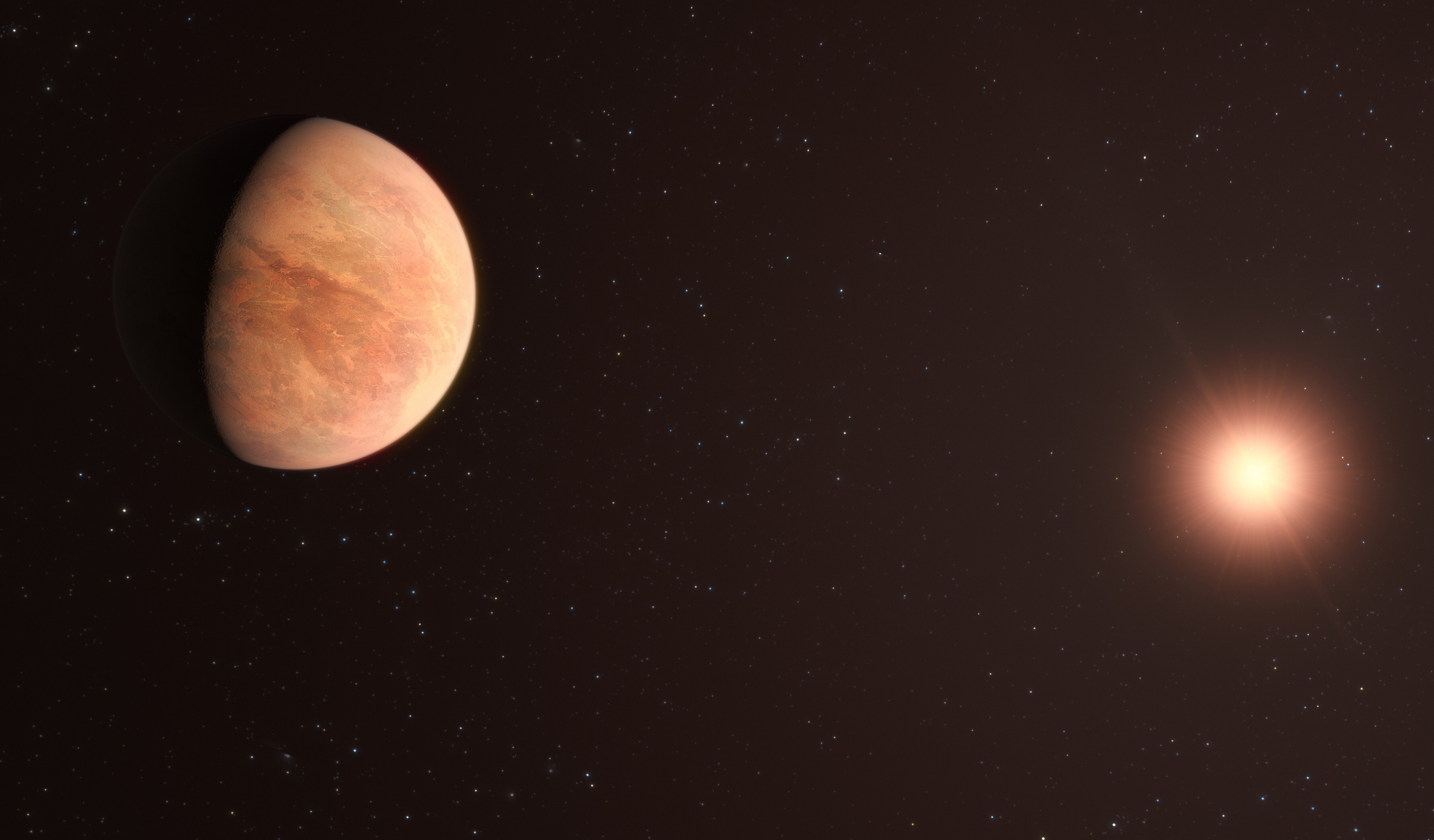
Artist's impression of L 98-59 b as a rocky planet with an atmosphere

== Table ==
To be included in the following list, an exoplanet must:

- Be terrestrial or nearly terrestrial (density >3.0 g/cm^{3} and radius <2.0R_{⊕})
- Transit its host star from the view of Earth
- Have been studied with transmission spectroscopy or secondary eclipse and have a published claim or inference of atmospheric detection, whether confirmed or not

Note that mass values prefixed with "~" have not been measured, but are estimated from the mass-radius relationship.

Row colors key
Solar system planet for reference
Solar system moon for reference
Rocky exoplanet with confirmed atmosphere detection
Rocky exoplanet with unconfirmed atmosphere detection
Mini-Neptune planet for reference

Planet/Moon	Host	Spectral type	Mass (M_{⊕})	Radius (R_{⊕})	Existence of atmosphere	Composition of atmosphere (by volume)	Atmospheric pressure at surface (atm)	Period (days)	Distance (ly)	Refs/notes
Earth (reported for reference)	Sun	G2V	1.00	1.00	Confirmed	78.08% nitrogen, 20.95% oxygen, 0.93% argon, water vapour and other trace gases	1.0	365.25	0	Only planet confirmed to harbour life
Venus (reported for reference)	Sun	G2V	0.815	0.950	Confirmed	96.5% carbon dioxide, 3.5% nitrogen, sulfur dioxide and other trace gases	92	244.26	~0	Has disputed detection of possible extremophile life
Mars (reported for reference)	Sun	G2V	0.107	0.533	Confirmed	95.97% carbon dioxide, 1.93% argon, 1.89% nitrogen, oxygen and other trace gases	0.0063	686.98	~0	
Io (reported for reference)	Jupiter	–	0.015	0.286	Confirmed	90% sulfur dioxide, sulfur monoxide, sodium chloride and monoatomic oxygen	0.000000005	1.769 (sidereal)	~0	
Titan (reported for reference)	Saturn	–	0.0225	0.404	Confirmed	(for the troposphere) 97% nitrogen, 2.7±0.1% methane, 0.1–0.2% hydrogen, organonitrogen haze	1.45	15.945 (sidereal)	~0	One of only two moons with a substantial atmosphere, the other being Triton
Triton (reported for reference)	Neptune	–	0.0036	0.212	Confirmed	nitrogen, methane and carbon monoxide traces	0.000014	5.877 (sidereal, retrograde)	~0	One of only two moons with a substantial atmosphere, the other being Titan
LTT 1445Ab	LTT 1445A	M2.5V	2.73	1.34	Unconfirmed	Probably water vapour or methane	0.1 or lower	5.36	22.4	
Gliese 486 b (Su)	Gliese 486 (Gar)	M3.5V	2.77	1.29	Unconfirmed	Probably water vapour		1.47	26.3	Unclear if the water vapour signal came from planet or host star
Gliese 357 b	Gliese 357	M2.5V	2.05	1.15	Unconfirmed	Likely carbon dioxide or abiotic oxygen		3.93	30.8	
Gliese 341 b	Gliese 341	M1V	~0.72	0.89	Unconfirmed	Likely water vapour or other small molecules		7.58	34.1	
L 98-59 b	L 98-59	M3V	0.47	0.85	Confirmed	Mostly sulfur dioxide		2.25	34.6	
L 98-59 c	L 98-59	M3V	2.22	1.38	Unconfirmed	Likely hydrogen with traces of carbon dioxide and water vapour		3.69	34.6	
TRAPPIST-1b	TRAPPIST-1	M8V	1.37	1.12	Unconfirmed	Likely carbon dioxide		1.51	40.6	
TRAPPIST-1c	TRAPPIST-1	M8V	1.31	1.10	Unconfirmed	Likely mostly oxygen and carbon dioxide traces	0.1–10 (if an atmosphere exists)	2.42	40.6	
TRAPPIST-1d	TRAPPIST-1	M8V	0.39	0.79	Unconfirmed	Probably carbon dioxide or clouds from water vapour	0.01 (approximate, if an atmosphere exists and is Mars-like)	4.05	40.6	Located in the habitable zone
TRAPPIST-1e	TRAPPIST-1	M8V	0.69	0.92	Unconfirmed	Likely nitrogen with methane traces		6.10	40.6	Located in the habitable zone
LHS 475 b	LHS 475	M3.5V	~0.91	0.99	Unconfirmed	Probably carbon dioxide	0.01 (approximate, if an atmosphere exists and is Mars-like without haze)	2.03	40.7	
55 Cancri Ae (Janssen)	55 Cancri A (Copernicus)	K0IV-V	7.99	1.87	Confirmed	Phosphorus monoxide, nitrogen and carbon dioxide or water vapour or phosphine, possibly with sodium and calcium	10 or higher	0.736	41.0	
GJ 1132 b	GJ 1132	M4V	1.66	1.13	Unconfirmed	Likely oxygen or carbon dioxide or clouds from potassium chloride/ zinc sulfide		1.63	41.1	
GJ 1214 b (Enaiposha)	GJ 1214 (Orkaria)	M4.5V	8.41	2.73	Confirmed	Haze and carbon dioxide, possibly with helium	Very high	1.58	47.8	
LHS 1140 b	LHS 1140	M4.5V	5.60	1.73	Unconfirmed	(Upper atmosphere) Probably helium, (Lower atmosphere) Likely nitrogen and water vapour		24.74	48.8	Located in the habitable zone
LHS 1478 b	LHS 1478	M3.5V	2.33	1.20	Unconfirmed	Likely pure carbon dioxide, carbon dioxide and water vapour or nitrogen and carbon dioxide	1–10 (if an atmosphere exists)	1.95	59.4	The dark bare-rock scenario was considered unlikely
TOI-260 b	TOI-260	K8V	4.23	1.76	Unconfirmed	Probably ethylene, acetylene, gaseous carbon or ammonia		13.47	65.9	The absorption features of these gases best match the 3.17 μm feature in the obtained spectra
GJ 1252 b	GJ 1252	M2.5V	1.32	1.18	Unconfirmed	Probably sodium, atomic oxygen and potassium	0.000001 or lower	0.518	66.5	
HD 97658 b	HD 97658	K1V	7.81	2.25	Confirmed	Clouds and likely hydrogen, carbon monoxide and methane	Very high	9.49	70.3	
TOI-732 c	TOI-732	M3.5V	8.04	2.39	Confirmed	Methane, 1-pentene and other alkenes or diethyl sulfide	Very high	12.25	71.8	
TOI-270 b	TOI-270	M3V	1.48	1.30	Unconfirmed	Likely water vapour		3.36	73.3	The planet has a lower density than previous estimate
TOI-270 d	TOI-270	M3V	4.20	2.13	Confirmed	Methane, carbon dioxide, water vapour, carbon disulfide, thioformaldehyde, possibly with sulfur dioxide and chloromethane or fluoromethane	Very high	11.38	73.3	
L 168-9 b (Qingluan)	L 168-9 (Danfeng)	M1V	4.07	1.63	Unconfirmed	Likely carbon dioxide		1.40	82.1	
GJ 3473 b	GJ 3473	M4V	1.86	1.24	Unconfirmed	Likely carbon dioxide or water vapour	1.2–6.5 or lower	1.20	89.3	
TOI-431 b	TOI-431	K2V	3.07	1.24	Unconfirmed	-		0.490	106	The dark bare-rock scenario was considered unlikely
TOI-1685 b	TOI-1685	M3V	3.07	1.42	Unconfirmed	Probably carbon dioxide or water vapour or sulfur dioxide or mixture of three gases		0.668	123	
HD 3167 b	HD 3167	K0V	4.84	1.60	Confirmed	–		0.959	154	
K2-141b	K2-141	K5V	5.08	1.51	Unconfirmed	Likely vapourized silicate-rock		0.280	202	
TOI-561 b	TOI-561	G9V	2.02	1.40	Confirmed	Volatiles including water vapour and oxygen, likely has clouds from mineral vapour	High	0.446	276	
TOI-1444 b	TOI-1444	G8V	3.87	1.36	Unconfirmed	Probably reflective mineral clouds		0.470	408	
K2-22b	K2-22	M0V	0.02	<0.71	Confirmed	Likely magnesium silicate dust and nitric oxide or carbon dioxide		0.381	801	

== See also ==
- Extraterrestrial atmosphere
- List of nearest terrestrial exoplanet candidates
- Lists of planets
