= GJ 1132 b =

Terrestrial exoplanet orbiting GJ 1132

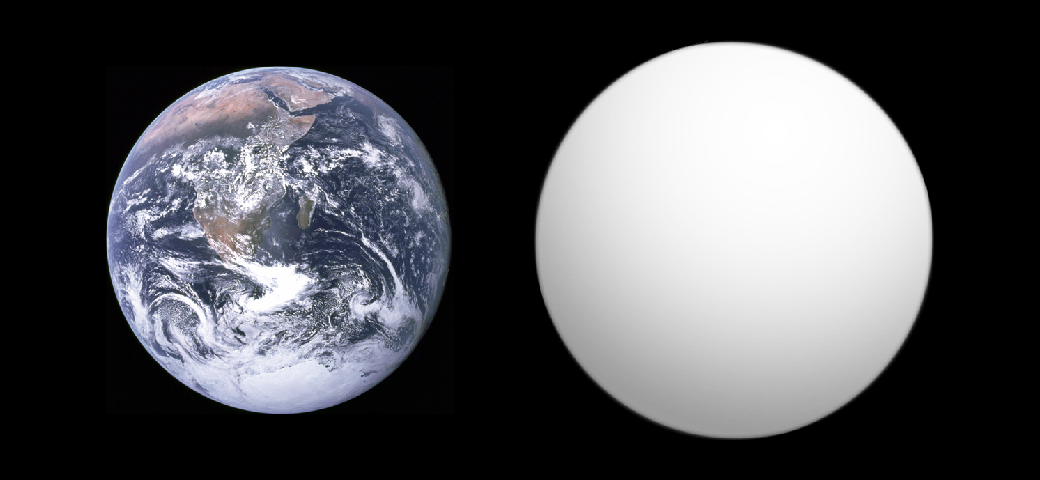
- Size comparison of GJ 1132 b with Earth

Discovery
- Discovered by: MEarth-South Array Team
- Discovery site: Chile
- Discovery date: May 10, 2015 (announced) November 12, 2015 (confirmed)
- Detection method: Transit

Orbital characteristics
- Semi-major axis: 0.01570±0.00013 AU
- Eccentricity: 0.0118+0.047 −0.0099
- Orbital period (sidereal): 1.62892911+0.00000029 −0.00000030 d
- Inclination: 86.58°±0.63°
- Semi-amplitude: 2.98±0.30 m/s
- Star: GJ 1132

Physical characteristics
- Mean radius: 1.130±0.056 R_{🜨}
- Mass: 1.66±0.23 M_{🜨}
- Mean density: 6.3±1.3 g/cm^{3}
- Surface gravity: 12.9±2.2 m/s^{2}
- Escape velocity: 13.6±1.0 km/s
- Albedo: 0.19+0.12 −0.15
- Temperature: 583.8+11 −8.5 K (310.6 °C; 591.2 °F, equilibrium); 709±31 K (436 °C; 817 °F, day side)

Atmosphere
- Composition by volume: None or extremely thin

GJ 1132 b (also known as Gliese 1132 b) is an exoplanet orbiting GJ 1132, a red dwarf star 41 light-years (13 parsecs) from Earth, in the constellation Vela. The planet is considered uninhabitable but was thought to be cool enough to possess an atmosphere. GJ 1132 b was discovered by the MEarth-South array in Chile.

It had been called "one of the most important planets ever discovered beyond the Solar System," due to its relative proximity to Earth, as telescopes should have been able to determine the composition of its atmosphere, the speed of its winds, and the color of its sunsets, if an atmosphere was present. This is due in part to the small diameter of its parent star (20% that of the Sun), which increases the effect on the star's light of its transits. The planet's diameter is about 13% larger than that of the Earth and its mass is estimated at 1.6 times that of Earth, implying that it has an Earth-like rocky composition. GJ 1132 b orbits its star every 1.6 days at a distance of 2.24 million kilometres (1.4 million miles).

The planet receives 19 times more stellar radiation than Earth. The equilibrium temperature is estimated at 529 K (256 °C; 493 °F) for an Earth-like albedo, or 409 K (136 °C; 277 °F) for a Venus-like albedo. The planet is likely to be hotter than Venus, as higher temperatures likely prevail at the surface if the planet has an atmosphere.

== Atmosphere ==
GJ 1132b has been subject to multiple claims about the detection of an atmosphere. In April 2017, a hydrogen-dominated atmosphere was claimed to have been detected around GJ 1132 b. However, subsequent, more precise work ruled out the claim. Instead, in 2021 detection of a hazy hydrogen atmosphere without helium but with the admixture methane and hydrogen cyanide (implying substantial underlying free nitrogen in the mix, at around 8.9% of the atmosphere) was claimed. Nevertheless, two subsequent studies found no evidence for molecular absorption in the HST WFC3 Spectrum of GJ 1132 b. Instead, the spectrum was found to be flat and featureless, consistent with GJ 1132 b being an airless rock.

A secondary eclipse observed by the James Webb Space Telescope and published in 2024 revealed a substellar temperature of 709±31 K (436 °C; 817 °F). This is only slightly below the maximum possible dayside temperature of 746+11
−14 K (473 °C; 883 °F), assuming a zero albedo planet with no heat redistribution. The thermal emission spectra rules out pure-carbon dioxide atmospheres above 0.006 bar and pure-water vapor atmospheres above 0.16 bar. Therefore, GJ 1132b likely has little to no atmosphere, consistent with the idea of the Cosmic shoreline, similar to other hot rocky M-dwarf planets, including: LHS 3844 b (Kuaꞌkua), GJ 1252 b, TRAPPIST-1b and c, GJ 367b (Tahay), and GJ 486b (Su).

== See also ==
- Habitability of red dwarf systems
- HD 219134 b, another rocky exoplanet with possible atmosphere
