= LHS 1478 b =

Hot super-Earth

Discovery
- Discovered by: M. G. Soto, et al.
- Discovery site: TESS
- Discovery date: February 2021
- Detection method: Transit

Designations
- Alternative names: TOI-1640 b

Orbital characteristics
- Semi-major axis: 0.01872±0.00015 AU
- Eccentricity: 0.038+0.16 −0.033
- Orbital period (sidereal): 1.94953941(50) d
- Inclination: 87.69°+0.41° −0.22°
- Argument of periastron: 86.2°+4.5° −130°
- Semi-amplitude: 3.12±0.62 m/s
- Star: LHS 1478

Physical characteristics
- Mean radius: 1.174±0.055 R_{🜨}
- Mass: 2.27±0.45 M_{🜨}
- Mean density: 7.7+2.0 −1.7 g/cm^{3}
- Temperature: 597.3+11 −7.0 K (324.1 °C; 615.5 °F, equilibrium)

LHS 1478 b is a super-Earth exoplanet orbiting around LHS 1478, a red dwarf star located 59.4 light-years from Earth in the constellation of Cassiopeia. It orbits at a distance of 0.018 AU from the star with a inclination of 87° to the plane of the sky. It takes LHS 1478b roughly 1.9 days to complete an orbit around the star.

It has a mass of 2.27 Earths and a radius of 1.17 Earths. It has a bulk density of 7.7 g cm^{−3} making it consistent with a terrestrial planet with a composition mainly of Fe (~30%) and MgSiO_{3}(~70%). It is classed as a hot super-Earth with an equilibrium temperature of 585 Kelvin receiving 21 times more energy from its star than Earth does from the Sun. This makes it impossible for water to remain a liquid on the surface suggesting that LHS 1478b may have a Venus-like atmosphere.

The star it orbits around is a fairly inactive red dwarf star allowing for favorable conditions for spectroscopic studies with the James Webb Space Telescope (JWST). This places LHS 1478b with a family of small rocky planets (GJ 357 b, GJ 1132 b and GJ 486 b) where meaningful and realistic measurements with JWST can be taken. JWST observations disfavor the possibility of a low-albedo bare rock, suggesting that the planet either has an atmosphere or a high albedo without an atmosphere.
