= Batsu =

Batsu may refer to:

- The Japanese name for the symbol "×", kanji 罰, meaning "wrong", as in a wrong answer or used to indicated a censored word
- A gesture in Japanese culture
- LHS 3844, also known as Batsũ̀
- Batsu game, a penalty game in a Japanese stage show
- Batsu Ichimonji, a character from the Rival Schools video game series
- Persona 2: Innocent Sin, an RPG for PlayStation
- Persona 2: Eternal Punishment, an RPG for PlayStation
- Bats & Terry or Batsu & Teri, a Japanese manga series, film and game
