= HD 3167 b =

Super-Earth exoplanet

Discovery
- Discovered by: Andrew Vanderburg, et al.
- Discovery site: Kepler (K2)
- Discovery date: September 2016
- Detection method: Transit

Designations
- Alternative names: K2-96 b

Orbital characteristics
- Semi-major axis: 0.01814+0.00027 −0.00024 AU
- Eccentricity: 0 (fixed)
- Orbital period (sidereal): 0.95965451+0.00000022 −0.00000021 d
- Inclination: 87.8°+1.5° −1.6°
- Argument of periastron: 90 (fixed)
- Semi-amplitude: 3.46±0.16 m/s
- Star: HD 3167

Physical characteristics
- Mean radius: 1.601+0.048 −0.036 R_{🜨}
- Mass: 4.844+0.270 −0.254 M_{🜨}
- Mean density: 6.49+0.52 −0.60 g/cm^{3}
- Temperature: 1781+18 −19 K (1,508 °C; 2,746 °F, equilibrium)

HD 3167 b is a super-Earth exoplanet that orbits the K-type star HD 3167. With an orbital period of just 0.959 days, it belongs to the group of ultra-short period planets. The planet was shown to possess an atmosphere in a 2026 study, becoming the coolest lava planet with evidence for an atmosphere.

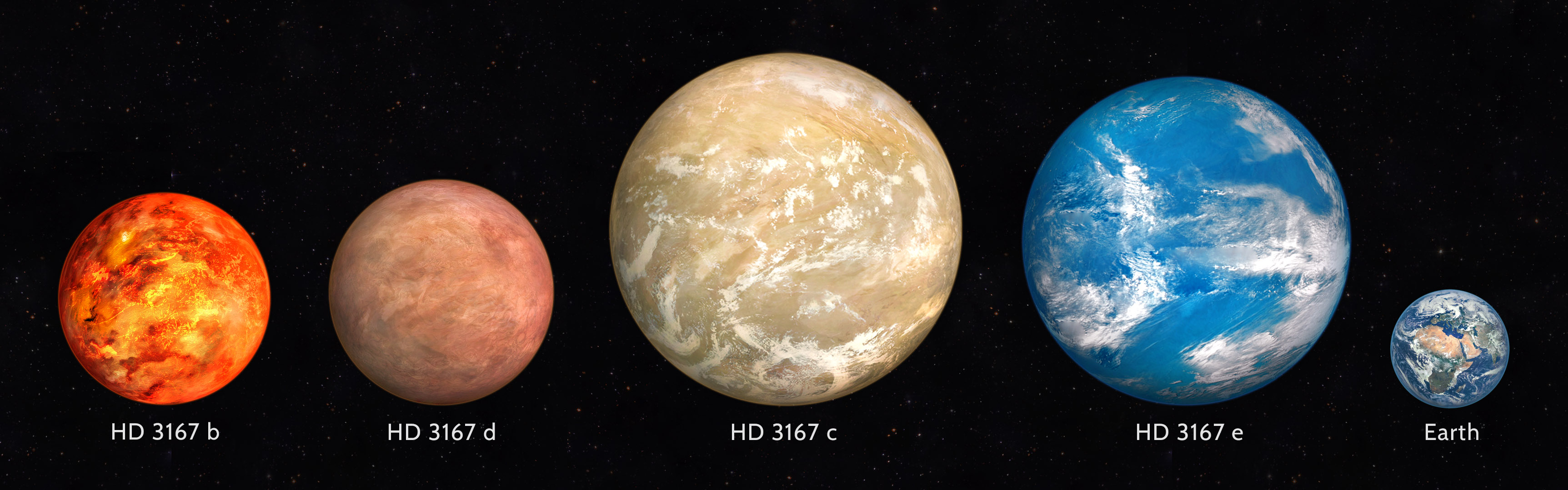
An artist's impression of the known planets of the HD 3167 system, including HD 3167 b, and their size compared with Earth.

== Characteristics ==
=== Radius, mass, composition and orbit ===
HD 3167 b was initially detected with the transit method, where the planet blocked a small percentage of its host star's light when passing between it and Earth. This allowed astronomers to accurately determine the planet's radius at 1.601 R🜨, with an uncertainty of 0.048 R🜨 (about 306 km). Radial velocity measurements helped constrain the planet's mass, which turned out to be around 4.84 M🜨. With both radius and mass known, the density of the planet can be calculated (about 6.49 g/cm^{3}), which implies a mainly rocky composition.

HD 3167 b orbits very close to its host star. One full revolution around HD 3167 takes only 0.959 days (~23 hours) to complete. It orbits in a nearly circular orbit at a distance of 0.01815 AU (2.72 million km), or about just four times the host star's radius.

=== Atmosphere and relationship with the cosmic sandbar ===
A 2019 study put constraints on the presence of atmospheric sodium and calcium for HD 3167 b, which are potential signs of volcanic activity. At this time, the existence of an atmosphere on the planet remained unproven.

JWST measurements of secondary eclipse reveals a substantially low white light eclipse depth, which is inconsistent with a "bare rock" planet with no atmosphere. This eclipse depth (along with the planet's slight under-dense density) are best explained by the existence of a significant atmosphere, which reflects incoming starlight and/or redistributes heat to the nightside of planet.

In an effort to understand why some lava planets (such as HD 3167 b) are able to retain their atmospheres for long periods in spite of extreme stellar radiation, a new concept of "cosmic sandbar" was proposed. In this model, the atmospheres of HD 3167 b and similar planets are continuously regulated by outgassing process from the magma ocean, which acts as a reservoir for the volatile compounds.

== See also ==
- List of terrestrial exoplanet candidates for atmosphere detection
- List of exoplanets discovered in 2016 - including HD 3167 b
