= Gliese 341 b =

Sub-Earth orbiting the red dwarf Gliese 341

Discovery
- Discovered by: James Kirk et al.
- Discovery date: January 11, 2024 (announced)
- Detection method: Transit

Designations
- Alternative names: TOI-741 b, LHS 2128 b, CD-59 2351 b, HD 304636 b, HIP 45908 b, LFT 643 b, L 140-9 b, LTT 3453 b

Orbital characteristics
- Eccentricity: 0(fixed)
- Orbital period (sidereal): 7.576860+0.000034 −0.000020 d
- Inclination: 88.17°+0.64° −0.51°
- Star: Gliese 341

Physical characteristics
- Mean radius: 0.89+0.05 −0.04 R_{🜨}
- Mass: <4.0 M_{🜨}, 0.72±0.14 M_{🜨} (estimate)
- Temperature: 560 K (287 °C) (equilibrium temperature), 760 K (487 °C) (irradiation temperature)

Gliese 341 b, also known as TOI-741 b or GJ 341 b, is a confirmed exoplanet orbiting Gliese 341, a red dwarf star located 33.9 light-years from Earth in the constellation Carina, visually close to the False Cross asterism. Having a radius of 0.92 R_{🜨} and an estimated mass of 0.72 M_{🜨}, it is classified as a sub-Earth. It was discovered in 2024 via transit observations and analyzed by James Webb Space Telescope in the search for an atmosphere.

== Properties ==
Gliese 341 b classifies as a sub-Earth planet, having a radius of about 0.89 R_{🜨} (5,700 km). Its mass is poorly known, only an upper limit of 4.0 M_{🜨} could be derived. Mass-radius relationships estimate a mass of 0.72 M_{🜨}.

It has a short orbit around its host star, with an orbital period of just eight days. The planet's equilibrium temperature is estimated at 560 K (287 °C), while its irradiation temperature is 760 K (487 °C).

As of 2024, it is not known whether TOI-741 b has an atmosphere. According to a transmission spectrum taken with the James Webb Space Telescope, scenarios such as a hazy atmosphere, a water-dominated atmosphere, or even no atmosphere are all plausible, while other scenarios such as an atmosphere with a high mean molecular weight are ruled out.

== Discovery and observations ==
Gliese 341 b was first identified in observations by the Transiting Exoplanet Survey Satellite (TESS) as a candidate planet yet to be confirmed. Its confirmation was first announced by a group of astronomers led by James Kirk, along with a transmission spectrum by the James Webb Space Telescope. They observed three transits of the planet detected by the James Webb Space Telescope's Near Infrared Camera (NIRCam) instrument. The discovery and confirmation was announced in January 2024.

The planet was later analyzed by Victoria DiTomasso et al., which refined the planetary and stellar parameters, and ruled out additional planets with orbital periods less than 1,750 days (4.8 years) and masses greater than 15.1 M_{🜨}.

== Host star ==
The host star of Gliese 341 b is Gliese 341, a nearby red dwarf 34 light-years from Earth in the constellation Carina. (Note: Obtained with a right ascension of 09^{h} 21^{m} 38^{s} and a declination of −60° 16′ 55″ on this website.) The star is about 48% the size of the Sun and 51% its mass, and has an effective temperature of 3800 K. With an apparent magnitude of 9.5, it is not visible to the naked eye, but can be observed through a small telescope. This star is visually close to the False Cross asterism, particularly close to Iota Carinae.

Gliese 341
Observation data Epoch J2000 Equinox J2000
- Constellation: Carina
- Right ascension: 09^{h} 21^{m} 37.60154^{s}
- Declination: −60° 16′ 55.0300″
- Apparent magnitude (V): 9.465

Characteristics
- Evolutionary stage: Main sequence
- Spectral type: M1V

Astrometry
Radial velocity (R_{v})	39.59±0.14 km/s
Proper motion (μ)	RA: −840.185 mas/yr Dec.: +182.056 mas/yr
Parallax (π)	95.6982±0.0145 mas
Distance	34.082 ± 0.005 ly (10.450 ± 0.002 pc)

Details
Mass	0.48±0.03 M_{☉}
Radius	0.5066±0.0170 R_{☉}
Surface gravity (log g)	4.72±0.02 cgs
Temperature	3,798±69 K
Metallicity [Fe/H]	−0.16±0.09 dex
Rotation	9.42+0.14 −0.08 days
Rotational velocity (v sin i)	2.32±0.65 km/s

Other designations
- TOI-741, GJ 341, HD 304636, HIP 45908, LHS 2128, TIC 359271092, TYC 8940-2067-1

Database references
SIMBAD	data

This star has long been studied because of its proximity and high proper motion, as well as it being a photometric and radial velocity standard star. It was once believed to be a spectroscopic binary, but this was ruled out in further observations.

The closest star to TOI-741 is the red dwarf L 140-289, located 2.5 light years away. The neighboring star L 98-59 has four confirmed exoplanets.

Nearest stars to Gliese 341
Name	Distance
L 140-289	2.5
SCR J0838-5855	4.1
SCR J0821-6703	5.7
L 98-59	6.3
Gliese 367	9

== See also ==
- List of exoplanets discovered in 2024
- List of star systems within 30–35 light-years
- LHS 475
- Gliese 486
- List of terrestrial exoplanet candidates for atmosphere detection
