= TRAPPIST-1c =

Rocky exoplanet orbiting TRAPPIST-1

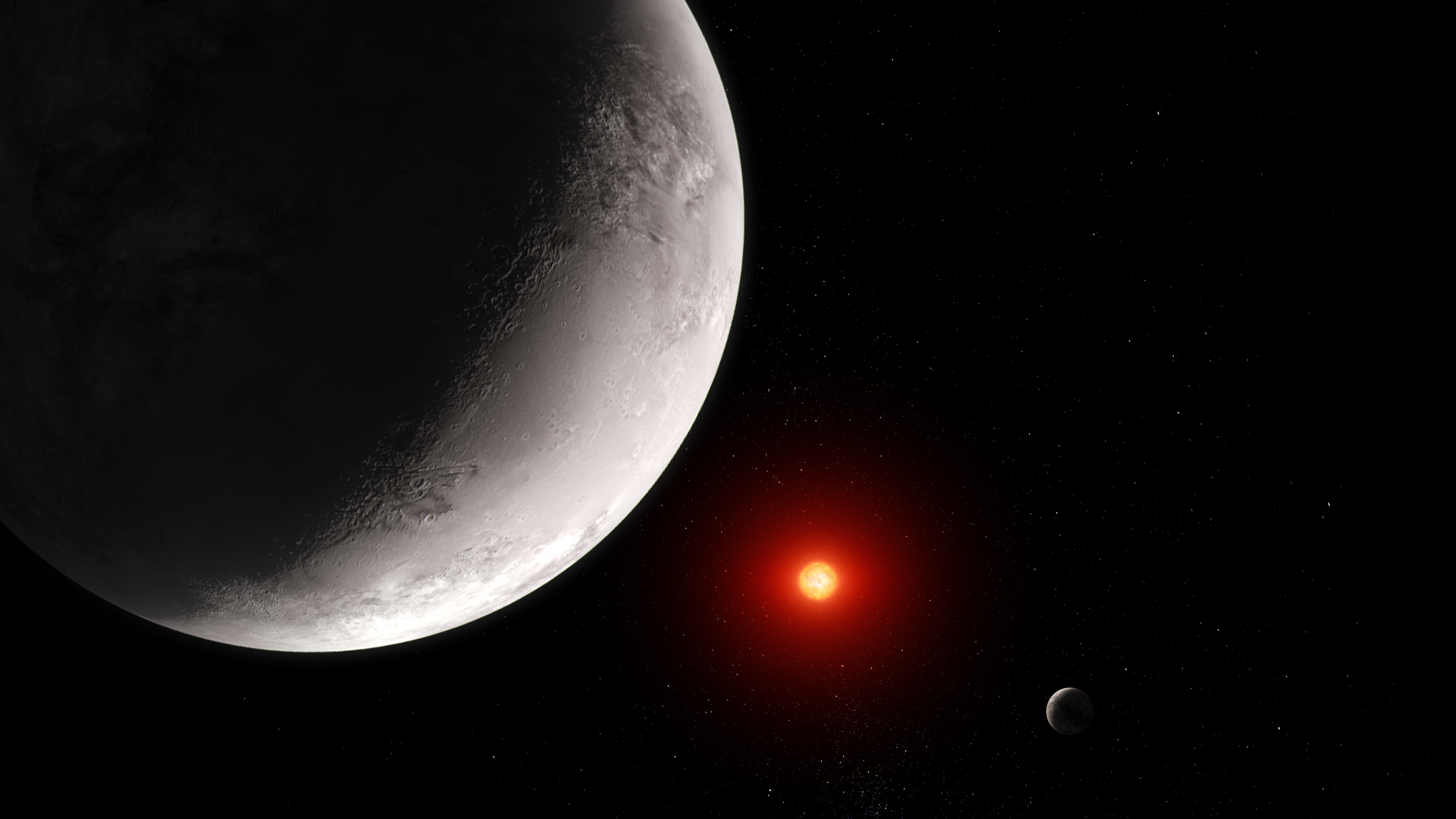
- Artist's impression of TRAPPIST-1c (June 2023) with TRAPPIST-1b in the background

Discovery
- Discovered by: Michaël Gillon et al.
- Discovery site: TRAPPIST
- Discovery date: 2 May 2016
- Detection method: Transit

Orbital characteristics
- Semi-major axis: 0.01580±0.00013 AU
- Eccentricity: 0.00654±0.00188
- Orbital period (sidereal): 2.421937±0.000018 d
- Inclination: 89.778°±0.118°
- Argument of periastron: 282.45°±17.10°
- Star: TRAPPIST-1

Physical characteristics
- Mean radius: 1.097+0.014 −0.012 R_{🜨}
- Mass: 1.308±0.056 M_{🜨}
- Mean density: 5.447+0.222 −0.235 g/cm^{3}
- Surface gravity: 1.086±0.043 g 10.65±0.42 m/s^{2}
- Temperature: 339.7±3.3 K (66.6 °C; 151.8 °F, equilibrium); 380±31 K (107 °C; 224 °F, surface)

Atmosphere
- Composition by volume: None or extremely thin 99% O_{2}, 1% CO_{2} (uncertain)

TRAPPIST-1c is a mainly rocky exoplanet orbiting around the ultra-cool red dwarf star TRAPPIST-1, located 40.7 light-years (12.5 parsecs) away from Earth in the constellation Aquarius. It is the third most massive and third largest planet of the system, with about 131% the mass and 110% the radius of Earth. Its density indicates a primarily rocky composition, and observations suggests against a thick CO_{2} atmosphere, which does not exclude a thick abiotic oxygen-dominated atmosphere.

== Physical characteristics ==
=== Mass, radius, and temperature ===
TRAPPIST-1c was observed with the transit method, which enabled scientists to calculate its radius. Transit-timing variations and computer simulations were able to determine the mass, density, and gravity of the planet. TRAPPIST-1c is the third-largest planet of the TRAPPIST-1 system, with a radius of 1.097 R_{🜨}. It is also the third-most massive of the system, with a mass of 1.308 M_{🜨}, slightly lower than that of the next most massive, TRAPPIST-1g. Initial estimates suggested that TRAPPIST-1c has a lower density (4.89 g/cm^{3}) and gravity (0.966g) than Earth, consistent with a rock-based composition and a thick, Venus-like atmosphere. However, refined density estimates show that the planet's density is similar to Earth.

TRAPPIST-1c's atmosphere was expected to be large enough to raise its surface temperature far above the calculated 334.8 K (61.7 °C; 143.0 °F) equilibrium temperature. However, an observation of the secondary eclipse of TRAPPIST-1c by the James Webb Space Telescope, announced in 2023, suggests against a thick CO_{2} atmosphere, however this does not exclude a thick abiotic oxygen dominated atmosphere as is hypothesized to be common around red dwarf stars, with a measured surface temperature of 380 K (107 °C; 224 °F). In addition, the planet may be very geologically active due to tidal squeezing similar to Jupiter's moon Io, which happens to have a similar orbital period and eccentricity (see TRAPPIST-1#Resonance and tides for references).

=== Orbit ===
The orbit of TRAPPIST-1c is very close to its host star. One year on the planet lasts a mere 2.42 days (58 hours), a fraction as long as that of the Solar System's innermost planet, Mercury, at 176 days. The planet orbits at a distance of 0.0158 AU (2.36 million km; 1.47 million mi), which is about 1.6% the distance between Earth and the Sun. At this proximity, TRAPPIST-1c is most likely tidally locked. However, due to the small size of its host star, the planet only receives about 2.1 times the sunlight as Earth (similar to Venus, at 1.9 times). Its orbital eccentricity is very low at 0.00654, similar to that of TRAPPIST-1b. It is in 8:5 resonance with TRAPPIST-1b and 5:3 resonance with TRAPPIST-1d.

=== Host star ===
TRAPPIST-1c orbits the ultracool dwarf star TRAPPIST-1. It is 0.12 R_{☉} and 0.09 M_{☉}, with a temperature of 2,566 K (2,293 °C; 4,159 °F) and an age of 7.6 billion years old. For comparison, the Sun has a temperature of 5,778 K and is about 4.6 billion years old. TRAPPIST-1 is also very dim, with about 0.0005 times (0.05%) the luminosity of the Sun. It is too faint to be seen with the naked eye, having an apparent magnitude of 18.80.

=== Atmosphere ===
The combined transmission spectrum of TRAPPIST-1 b and c rules out a cloud-free hydrogen-dominated atmosphere for each planet, so they are unlikely to harbor an extended gas envelope. Prior to JWST observations, other atmospheres, from a cloud-free water-vapor atmosphere to a Venus-like atmosphere, remained consistent with the featureless spectrum.

In 2018, the composition of TRAPPIST-1c was determined, and has been found to be rock-based. The presence of an atmosphere could not be confirmed. An observation of the secondary eclipse of TRAPPIST-1c by the James Webb Space Telescope, announced in 2023 rules out a thick carbon dioxide atmosphere like that of Venus. This is similar to JWST results on the inner planet TRAPPIST-1b announced earlier the same year, which suggest that it does not have a thick CO_{2} dominated atmosphere. In 2024, transmission spectra of the planet had ruled out a hydrogen-dominated atmosphere with >3σ confidence and an atmosphere rich in water, ammonia or carbon monoxide with a pressure of 1 bar when taking into account stellar contamination.

== See also ==
- 55 Cancri e
- GJ 1132 b
- List of terrestrial exoplanet candidates for atmosphere detection
