= Kilogram per cubic metre =

SI derived unit of density

kilogram per cubic metre
- Density of the cube: 1 kg/m^{3}

General information
- Unit system: SI
- Unit of: density
- Symbol: kg/m^{3}

Conversions
1 kg/m^{3} in ...	... is equal to ...
- Imperial and US Customary units: 0.06242796 lb/cu ft
- CGS units: 0.001 g/cm^{3}
- MTS units: 0.001 t/m^{3}

The kilogram per cubic metre (symbol: kg·m^{−3}, or kg/m^{3}) is the unit of density in the International System of Units (SI). It is defined by dividing the SI unit of mass, the kilogram, by the SI unit of volume, the cubic metre.

== Conversions ==
=== To other units ===
- 1 kg/m^{3} = 1 g/L (exactly)
- 1 kg/m^{3} = 0.001 g/cm^{3} (exactly)
- 1 kg/m^{3} ≈ 0.06243 lb/ft^{3} (approximately)
- 1 kg/m^{3} ≈ 0.1335 oz/US gal (approximately)
- 1 kg/m^{3} ≈ 0.1604 oz/imp gal (approximately)

=== From other units ===
- 1 g/cm^{3} = 1000 kg/m^{3} (exactly)
- 1 lb/ft^{3} ≈ 16.02 kg/m^{3} (approximately)
- 1 oz/(US gal) ≈ 7.489 kg/m^{3} (approximately)
- 1 oz/(imp gal) ≈ 6.236 kg/m^{3} (approximately)

== Relation to other measures ==
The density of water is about 1000 kg/m^{3} or 1 g/cm^{3}, because the size of the gram was originally based on the mass of a cubic centimetre of water.

In chemistry, g/cm^{3} is more commonly used.

== See also ==
- List of metric units
- MKS units
