= LTT 1445Ab =

Discovery
- Discovered by: Jennifer G. Winters, et al.
- Discovery site: TESS
- Discovery date: June 2019
- Detection method: Transit

Orbital characteristics
- Semi-major axis: 0.03810+0.00067 −0.00070 AU
- Orbital period (sidereal): 5.3587635+0.0000044 −0.0000045 d
- Inclination: 89.53°+0.33° −0.40°
- Semi-amplitude: 2.47±0.20 m/s
- Star: LTT 1445A

Physical characteristics
- Mean radius: 1.34+0.11 −0.06 R_{🜨}
- Mass: 2.73+0.25 −0.23 M_{🜨}
- Mean density: 6.2+1.2 −1.3 g/cm^{3}
- Temperature: 431±23 K (158 °C; 316 °F, equilibrium); 525±15 K (252 °C; 485 °F, dayside)

LTT 1445Ab is a 5-day super-Earth planet that orbits the red dwarf star LTT 1445A, itself a part of triple star system LTT 1445. As of 2026, it is not clear whether the planet possesses an atmosphere or not.

== Characteristics ==
=== Radius, mass and composition ===
LTT 1445Ab was initially detected with the transit method with TESS, where the planet blocked a small percentage of its host star's light when passing between it and Earth. This allowed astronomers to accurately determine the planet's radius at 1.07 R_{🜨}, with an uncertainty of 0.10 R_{🜨} (about 635 km). Follow-up radial velocity observations two years later helped constrain the planet mass, which turned out to be around 2.73 M_{🜨}. These measurements together imply a mainly rocky composition for the planet.

=== Orbit ===
LTT 1445Ab orbits close to its star. One full revolution around LTT 1445A takes 5.359 days (~128.6 hours). Its eccentricity is quite low, and was constrained to be less than 0.11.

=== Temperature and atmosphere ===
LTT 1445Ab has an equilibrium temperature (which is the surface temperature of a black-body with no atmosphere, assuming an Earth-like albedo) of 431±23 K (158 °C; 316 °F).

LTT 1445Ab lies very close to the "cosmic shoreline", and potentially lying on the "dry" (i.e, without an atmosphere) side.

In 2022, a planetary transmission spectrum showed no evidence for an atmosphere, although an atmosphere with high altitude hazes cannot be ruled out yet. In 2025 a transmission spectrum with Hubble was published. The spectrum is consistent with a flat line. Only the infrared shows potential features consistent with hydrogen cyanide molecules. Some retrievals weakly favour an atmosphere, but these could be stellar contamination such as starspots.

A thermal emission spectrum of LTT 1445Ab was detected in 2024 with JWST MIRI low resultion spectroscopy (LRS). The observation observed the planet during the secondary eclipse at the 5-12 μm range. During a secondary eclipse the planet disappears behind the star. This allowed the scientists to determine the dayside brightness temperature of 525 ± 15 K (252 °C; 485 °F). This measurement is consistent with a dark (low-albedo) rocky surface. The observations disfavour a very thick CO_{2} atmosphere, but it was uncertain if a moderately thin atmosphere is possible (atmospheres like those on Mars, Titan or Earth). However, a later eclipse depth measurement carried out with JWST suggested that the planet indeed lacks a substantial atmosphere, with surface pressure determined to be less than or equal to 0.1 bar. This measurement also favored (but did not prove) some very thin atmosphere-scenarios, such as ones dominated by methane or water vapour.
