= GJ 1252 =

Red dwarf star in the constellation Telescopium

Observation data Epoch J2000 Equinox ICRS
- Constellation: Telescopium
- Right ascension: 20^{h} 27^{m} 42.08140^{s}
- Declination: −56° 27′ 25.1519″
- Apparent magnitude (V): 12.193

Characteristics
- Evolutionary stage: Main sequence
- Spectral type: M2.5V
- Apparent magnitude (B): 13.655±0.029
- Apparent magnitude (V): 12.193±0.056
- Apparent magnitude (G): 11.235±0.003
- Apparent magnitude (J): 8.697±0.019
- Apparent magnitude (H): 8.161±0.034
- Apparent magnitude (K): 7.915±0.023

Astrometry
Radial velocity (R_{v})	7.38±0.29 km/s
Proper motion (μ)	RA: 424.417 mas/yr Dec.: −1,230.941 mas/yr
Parallax (π)	49.0555±0.0247 mas
Distance	66.49 ± 0.03 ly (20.39 ± 0.01 pc)

Details
Mass	0.381±0.008 M_{☉}
Radius	0.391±0.012 R_{☉}
Luminosity (bolometric)	0.0196+0.0026 −0.0023 L_{☉}
Surface gravity (log g)	4.83±0.03 cgs
Temperature	3,458+140 −133 K
Metallicity [Fe/H]	−0.18±0.13 dex
Age	3.9±0.4 Gyr

Other designations
- GJ 1252, L 210-70, LFT 1546, LHS 492, LTT 8083, NLTT 49258, PM J20277-5627, TOI-1078, TIC 370133522, GCRV 26183, 2MASS J20274210-5627262

Database references
SIMBAD	data
Exoplanet Archive	data
ARICNS	data

GJ 1252 is a red dwarf star located 66.5 light-years (20.4 parsecs) away from the Solar System in the constellation of Telescopium. The star has about 38% the mass and 39% the radius of the Sun, and a temperature of about 3,458 K (3,185 °C; 5,765 °F). GJ 1252 is orbited by one known exoplanet.

== Planetary system ==
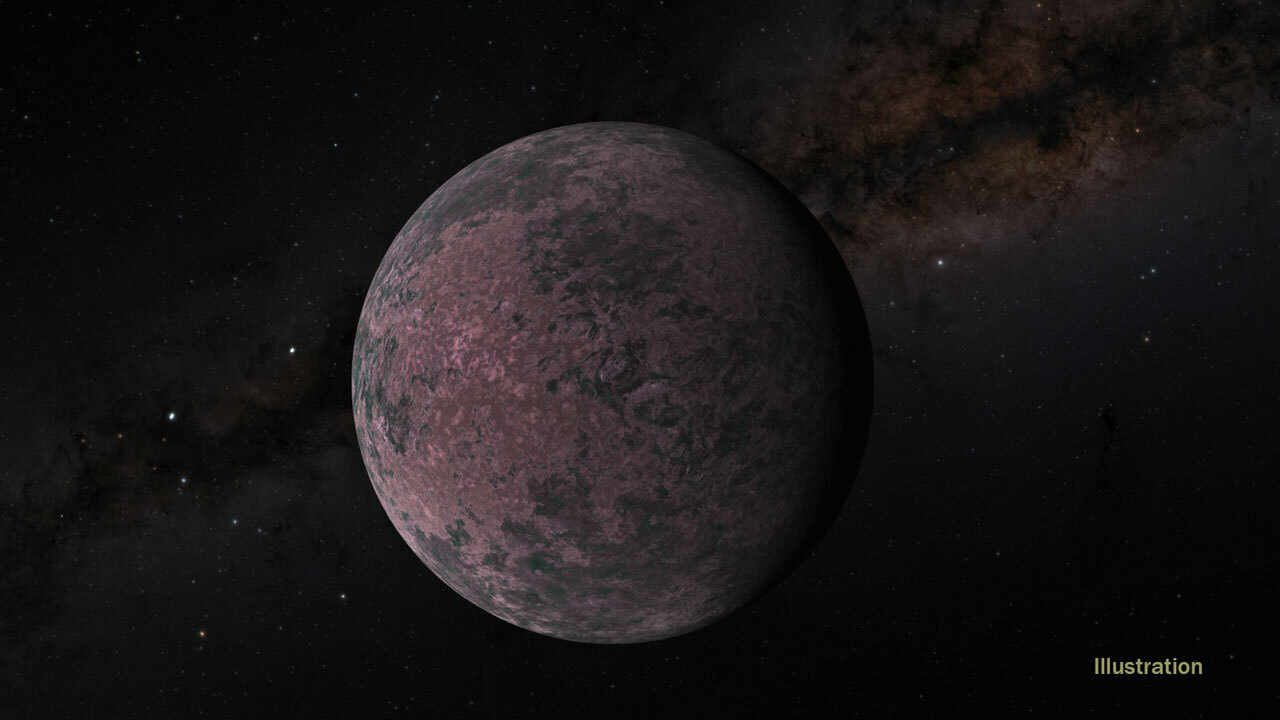
Artist's impression of GJ 1252 b

GJ 1252 was found to have a planet, GJ 1252 b, in 2019 using transit observations from TESS. It is a terrestrial planet larger than Earth, with about 1.3 times the mass and 1.18 times the radius of Earth. Orbiting its star with a very short period of just 12.4 hours, it is presumably tidally locked. Secondary eclipse observations have shown that GJ 1252 b lacks a significant atmosphere, similar to LHS 3844 b and TRAPPIST-1b, and have measured its dayside temperature at about 1,410 K (1,140 °C; 2,080 °F).

A candidate second planet was identified in 2022 with Doppler spectroscopy (radial velocity method), named GJ 1252 c. It orbits with a period of 18.41 days and has a mass of at least 6.08 M_{🜨}. The existence of this planet in uncertain, as the radial velocity variations may be intrinsic to the star rather than due to the gravitational pull of an orbiting body.

The GJ 1252 planetary system
Companion (in order from star)	Mass	Semimajor axis (AU)	Orbital period (days)	Eccentricity	Inclination (°)	Radius
b	1.54±0.18 M_{🜨}	0.00915±0.00015	0.51824160	0	84.8±3.2	1.19±0.05 R_{🜨}
c (unconfirmed)	≥6.08±0.86 M_{🜨}	—	18.41±0.01	0.20+0.11 −0.10	—	—
