= Chi Virginis =

Star in the constellation Virgo

χ Virginis
- Location of χ Virginis (circled)

Observation data Epoch J2000.0 Equinox ICRS
- Constellation: Virgo
- Right ascension: 12^{h} 39^{m} 14.76696^{s}
- Declination: −07° 59′ 44.0338″
- Apparent magnitude (V): 4.652

Characteristics
- Evolutionary stage: red giant branch
- Spectral type: K2 III
- U−B color index: +1.389
- B−V color index: +1.239

Astrometry
| Radial velocity (R_{v}) | −18.11±0.07 km/s |
| Proper motion (μ) | RA: −77.223 mas/yr Dec.: −24.409 mas/yr |
| Parallax (π) | 10.3526±0.1151 mas |
| Distance | 315 ± 4 ly (97 ± 1 pc) |
| Absolute magnitude (M_{V}) | −0.29±0.19 |

Details
| Mass | 2.28±0.35 M_{☉} |
| Radius | 20.15±2 R_{☉} |
| Luminosity | 107 L_{☉} |
| Surface gravity (log g) | 2.15±0.1 cgs |
| Temperature | 4,559±53 K |
| Metallicity | 0.05±0.1 |
| Rotational velocity (v sin i) | 2.52±0.45 km/s |
| Age | 0.86±0.34 Gyr |

Other designations
- 26 Virginis, BD−07°3452, GC 17227, GCRV 7604, HD 110014, HIP 61740, HR 4813, PPM 195694, SAO 138892.

Database references
| SIMBAD | data |
| Exoplanet Archive | data |

Chi Virginis (χ Vir, χ Virginis) is a double star in the constellation Virgo. Based upon parallax measurements, it is approximately 315 light-years (97 parsecs) from Earth. It has an apparent visual magnitude of 4.65, which is bright enough to be seen with the unaided eye under suitable viewing conditions.

This star has a stellar classification of K2 III, with the luminosity class "III" indicating that this is a giant star that has consumed the hydrogen at its core and evolved away from the main sequence. It has a mass about double that of the Sun and has expanded to 20 times the Sun's radius, giving it a luminosity of 107 times the luminosity of the Sun. The effective temperature of the star's outer envelope is about 4,559 K, which gives the star the orange hue typical of K-type stars. The abundance of elements other than hydrogen and helium, what astronomers term the star's metallicity, is slightly caojibai higher than in the Sun.

This star has three optical companions. At an angular separation of 173.1 arcseconds is a magnitude +9.1 star, which is of spectral type K0. A 10th magnitude star is located 221.2 arcseconds away, and the third is a magnitude +9.1 K2 star 321.2 arcseconds away. None of these have been confirmed as a physical companion.

== Planetary system ==
In July 2009, it was discovered that Chi Virginis has a massive planet with a high orbital eccentricity of 0.46. It is orbiting with a period of about 835 days and has a mass at least 11 times greater than Jupiter. There are indications of a second planet orbiting with a period of 130 days, but this has not been firmly established.

In May 2015, the existence of a second planet candidate, HD 110014 c, (Chi Virginis c, about three times the mass of Jupiter and having an orbit roughly that of Venus) was announced by Chilean astronomer Maritza Soto. The two-planet model could not be confirmed, and the radial velocity variations attributed to the second planet might instead be caused by a starspot. A 2021 review of planets around giant stars lists this second planet as "questionable".

The Chi Virginis planetary system
| Companion (in order from star) | Mass | Semimajor axis (AU) | Orbital period (days) | Eccentricity | Inclination (°) | Radius |
|---|---|---|---|---|---|---|
| c (unconfirmed) | ≥3.1±0.4 M_{J} | 0.64±0.003 | 130.0±0.9 | 0.44±0.2 | — | — |
| b | ≥10.7±1.0 M_{J} | 2.31±0.04 | 882.6±21.5 | 0.26±0.1 | — | — |

== See also ==
- 70 Virginis
- HD 16760
- Lists of exoplanets
