= HD 3167 =

Star in the constellation Pisces

Observation data Epoch J2000 Equinox ICRS
- Constellation: Pisces
- Right ascension: 00^{h} 34^{m} 57.524^{s}
- Declination: +04° 22′ 53.28″
- Apparent magnitude (V): 8.97

Characteristics
- Evolutionary stage: Main sequence
- Spectral type: K0 V
- B−V color index: 0.827±0.021
- Variable type: Constant

Astrometry
Radial velocity (R_{v})	+19.5±0.1 km/s
Proper motion (μ)	RA: +107.569 mas/yr Dec.: −173.334 mas/yr
Parallax (π)	21.1363±0.0187 mas
Distance	154.3 ± 0.1 ly (47.31 ± 0.04 pc)
Absolute magnitude (M_{V})	5.67

Details
Mass	0.864+0.039 −0.034 M_{☉}
Radius	0.865+0.022 −0.017 R_{☉}
Luminosity	0.553±0.020 L_{☉}
Surface gravity (log g)	4.504+0.016 −0.024 cgs
Temperature	5,350+66 −71 K
Metallicity [Fe/H]	0.037+0.078 −0.081 dex
Rotational velocity (v sin i)	1.7±1.1 km/s
Age	8.4+3.3 −3.5 Gyr

Other designations
- BD+03°68, HD 3167, HIP 2736, LTT 10198, K2-96, EPIC 220383386, 2MASS J00345752+0422531

Database references
SIMBAD	data
Exoplanet Archive	data

HD 3167 is a single, orange-hued star in the zodiac constellation of Pisces that hosts a system with four exoplanets. The star is too faint to be seen with the naked eye, having an apparent visual magnitude of 8.97. The distance to HD 3167 can be determined from its annual parallax shift of 21.1363 mas as measured by the Gaia space observatory, yielding a range of 154 light years. It has a relatively high proper motion, traversing the celestial sphere at the rate of 0.204″ per year. Since it was first photographed during the Palomar observatory sky survey in 1953, it had moved over 12.5″ by 2017. The star is moving away from the Earth with an average heliocentric radial velocity of +19.5 km/s.

This is an ordinary K-type main-sequence star with a stellar classification of K0 V and no significant variability. The star has 86% of the mass of the Sun and 86% of the Sun's radius. It is a chromospherically inactive star and is radiating 56% of the Sun's luminosity from its photosphere at an effective temperature of 5,261 K. The spin of the star displays a relatively low projected rotational velocity of around 1.7 km/s. It has a near solar metallicity – a term astronomers use for the proportion of elements other than hydrogen and helium in a stellar atmosphere.

In 2019, a group of astronomers first reported that the orbits of the detected exoplanets hosted by the star are oddly unusual: two planets (HD 3167 c; HD 3167 d) revolve around the star on polar orbits, i.e. orbits that pass over the poles of the star. Later, in October 2021, the third planet (HD 3167 b) was found to orbit around the equator of the star instead, while confirming the other planets' orbital inclinations from the 2019 study.

== Planetary system ==
In 2016, data collected during the extended K2 mission of the Kepler space telescope was used to identify two transiting exoplanet candidates orbiting this star, designated HD 3167 b and HD 3167 c. This made it one of the closest and brightest such multi-transiting stars known at the time. The lack of chromospheric activity makes it ideal for the precise radial velocity (RV) measurements needed to estimate the masses of its planets. Follow-up RV observations showed additional perturbation signals beyond the two planets already identified. This led to the discovery in 2017 of a third, non-transiting planet, designated HD 3167 d.

=== Planet b ===
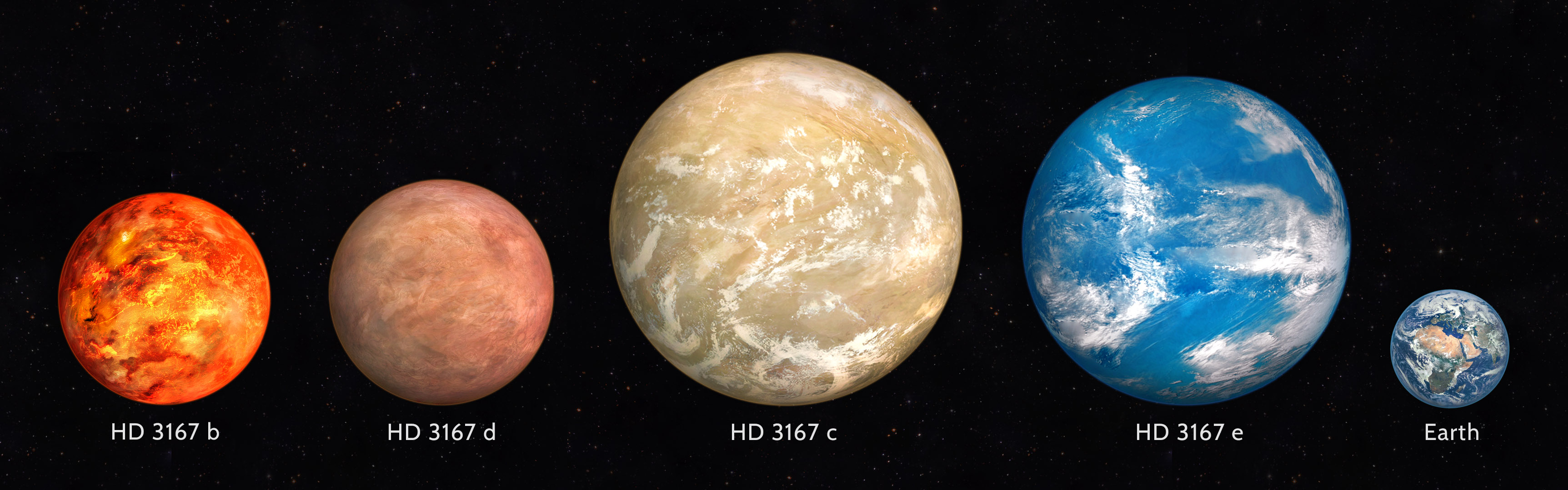
An artist's impression of the known planets of the HD 3167 system, and their size compared with Earth.

=== Planet c ===
The second planet, HD 3167 c, has an orbital period of 29.8454 days and an eccentricity of less than 0.267. The semimajor axis is 0.1795 AU. It has 9.80 M_{🜨} and 3.01 R_{🜨}, giving it a low bulk density of 1.97+0.94
−0.59 g/cm^{3}. This suggests either a mini-Neptune with a gaseous envelope consisting mainly of hydrogen and helium, or a planet consisting of mostly water. In 2020, transmission spectroscopy measurements of its atmosphere strongly favored a model with a high (>700 × Solar) metallicity atmosphere, due to discovered molecular absorption bands which cannot be attributed to hydrogen or helium. The incident flux from the host star is around 16 times the amount the Earth receives from the Sun, and it is less susceptible to atmospheric stripping than HD 3167 b.

=== Planet d and planet e ===
The orbital inclination of HD 3167 d is inclined at least 1.3° away from the orbital planes of the other two exoplanets. Its orbit is expected to remain stable for periods longer than 100 million years only if this inclination is less than 40°. It has an orbital period of 8.509±0.045 d, placing it in between the other two orbits, and shows a minimum mass of 6.90 M_{🜨}. The true mass is most likely less than Neptune.

A fourth planet, HD 3167 e, first suggested as a candidate in 2019, was discovered in 2022 by the radial-velocity method.

The HD 3167 planetary system
Companion (in order from star)	Mass	Semimajor axis (AU)	Orbital period (days)	Eccentricity	Inclination (°)	Radius
b	4.844+0.270 −0.254 M_{🜨}	0.01814+0.00027 −0.00024	0.95965451(22)	0 (fixed)	87.8+1.5 −1.6	1.601+0.048 −0.036 R_{🜨}
d	7.25+9.85 −2.45 M_{🜨}	0.0770+0.0011 −0.0010	8.3967+0.0024 −0.0025	0.35+0.13 −0.12	39+34 −24	—
c	11.41+0.858 −0.826 M_{🜨}	0.1794+0.0027 −0.0024	29.846511(15)	0.040+0.044 −0.028	89.433+0.094 −0.077	2.983+0.083 −0.068 R_{🜨}
e	14.94+15.89 −4.770 M_{🜨}	0.3797+0.0057 −0.0051	91.90+0.30 −0.29	0.128+0.110 −0.087	41+32 −23	—
