= LHS 475 b =

Extrasolar planet

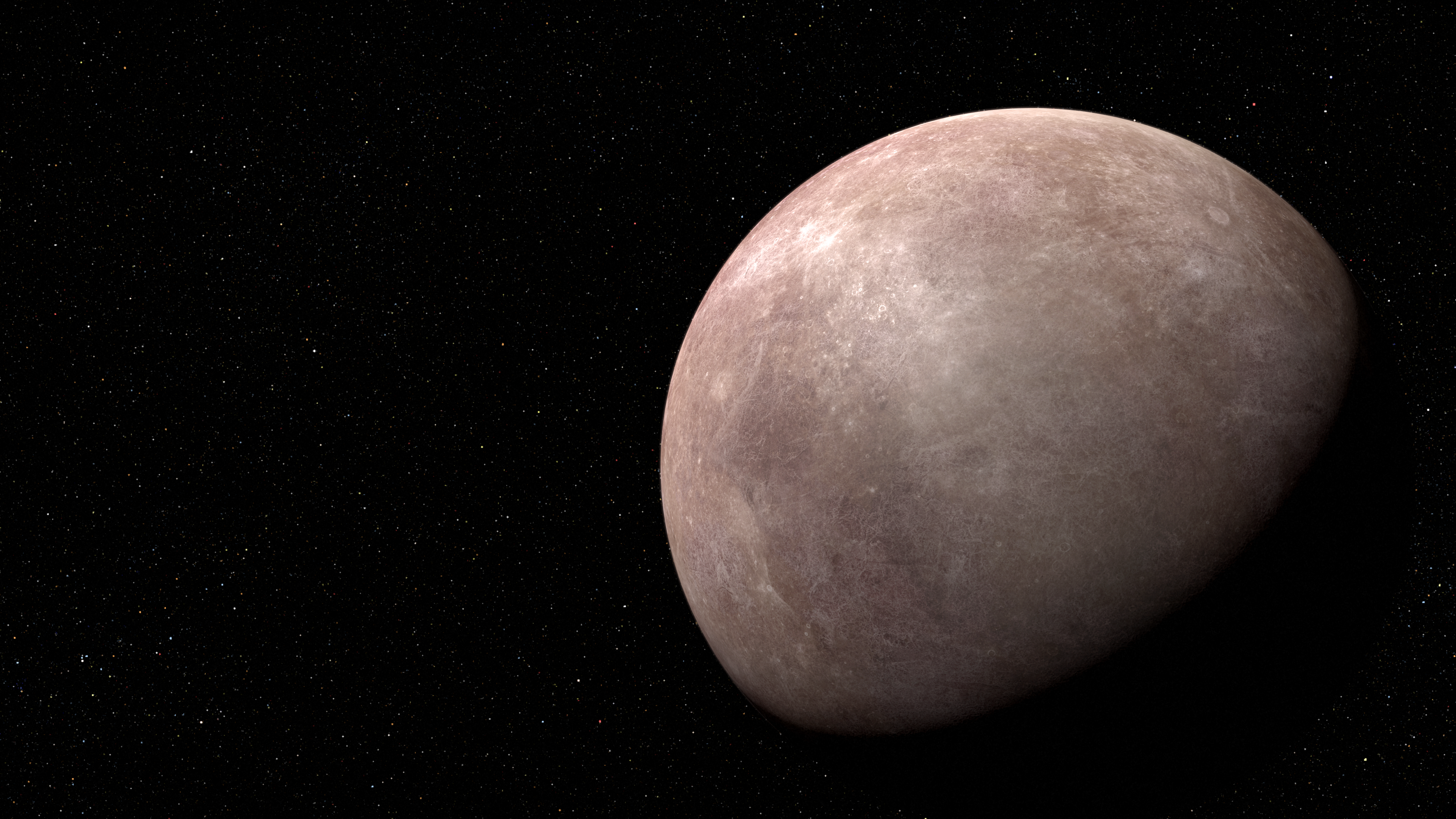
- Artist's rendering of LHS 475b

Discovery
- Discovered by: James Webb Space Telescope
- Discovery date: 2023
- Detection method: Transit

Orbital characteristics
- Orbital period (sidereal): 2.0291±0.0000 d
- Star: LHS 475

Physical characteristics
- Mean radius: 0.99±0.05 R_{🜨}
- Mass: 0.91±0.19 M_{🜨}
- Temperature: 586 K (313 °C, 595 °F)

LHS 475 b is a terrestrial exoplanet orbiting the star LHS 475 which is about 40.7 light years away, in the constellation of Octans. It was the first extrasolar planet to be confirmed by the James Webb Space Telescope. It completes an orbit every 2 days and is 99% the diameter of Earth. It is also one of the most similar-to-Earth exoplanets discovered, in terms of radius.

== Physical characteristics ==
LHS 475 b has a radius equivalent to 99% of the Earth's radius and a mass equivalent to 91.4% of the Earth's mass. It completes an orbit around its star in about 2 days and is most likely tidally locked.

=== Atmosphere ===
It is not yet known whether LHS 475 b has an atmosphere. It is possible that, in fact, it does not, but there are some atmospheric compositions that have not been ruled out, such as an atmosphere made up of 100% carbon dioxide, which is difficult to detect. As it is very hot, with a temperature of 313 °C, if clouds are detected on its surface, this could suggest that LHS 475 b is similar to Venus, which has an atmosphere made up of carbon dioxide surrounded by thick clouds.

== Discovery and observation ==
The Transiting Exoplanet Survey Satellite (TESS) telescope indicated the existence of an exoplanet around the star LHS 475 through transit information.

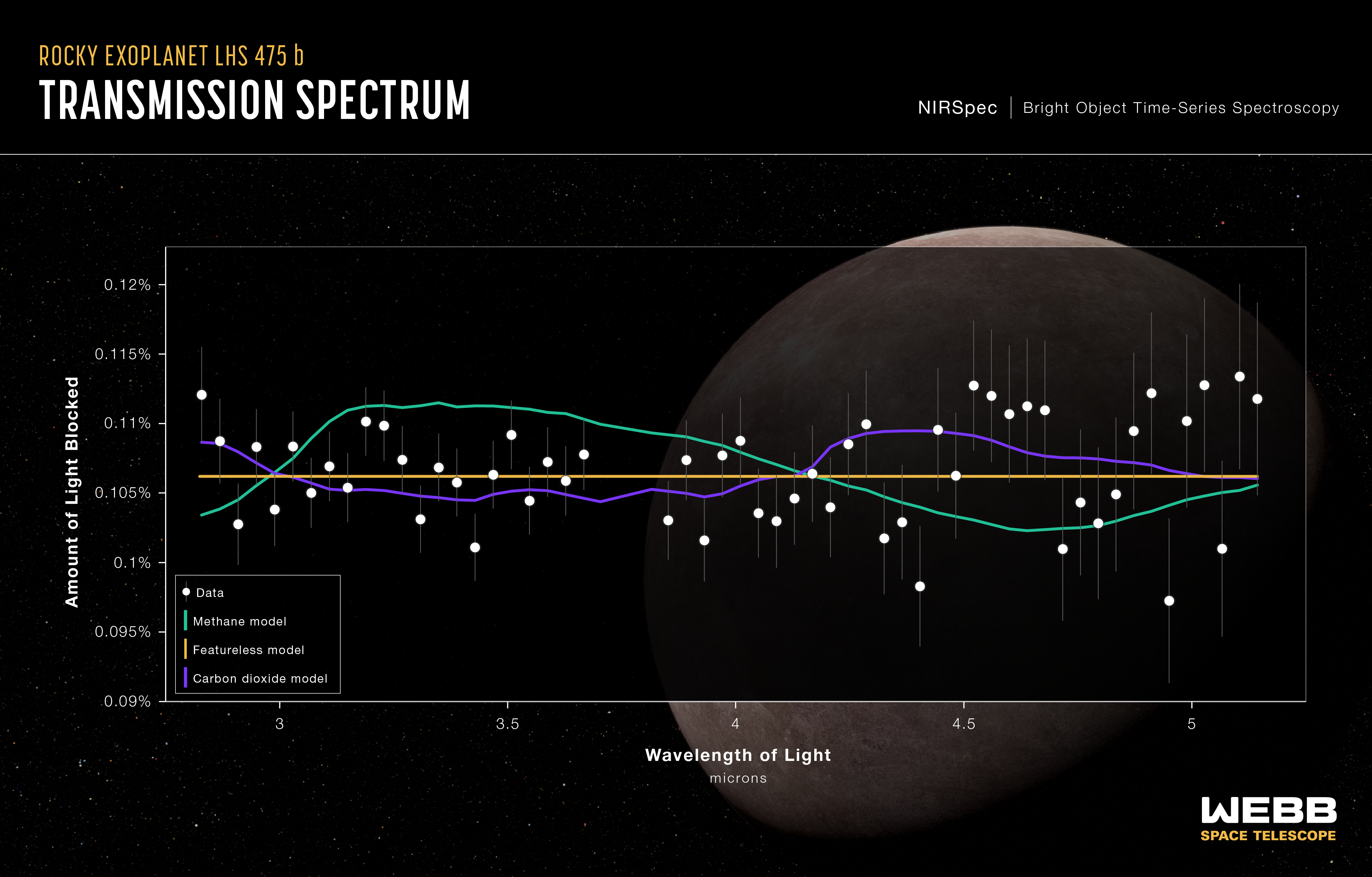
Transmission spectrum of LHS 475 b from NIRSpec.

On August 31, 2022, the James Webb Space Telescope's NIRSpec instrument captured the exoplanet with just two transit observations and observed its transmission spectrum. Confirmation of LHS 475 b by the James Webb Space Telescope was published on January 11, 2023.

== See also ==
- List of exoplanets discovered in 2023
- List of terrestrial exoplanet candidates for atmosphere detection
