= TRAPPIST-1b =

Rocky exoplanet orbiting TRAPPIST-1

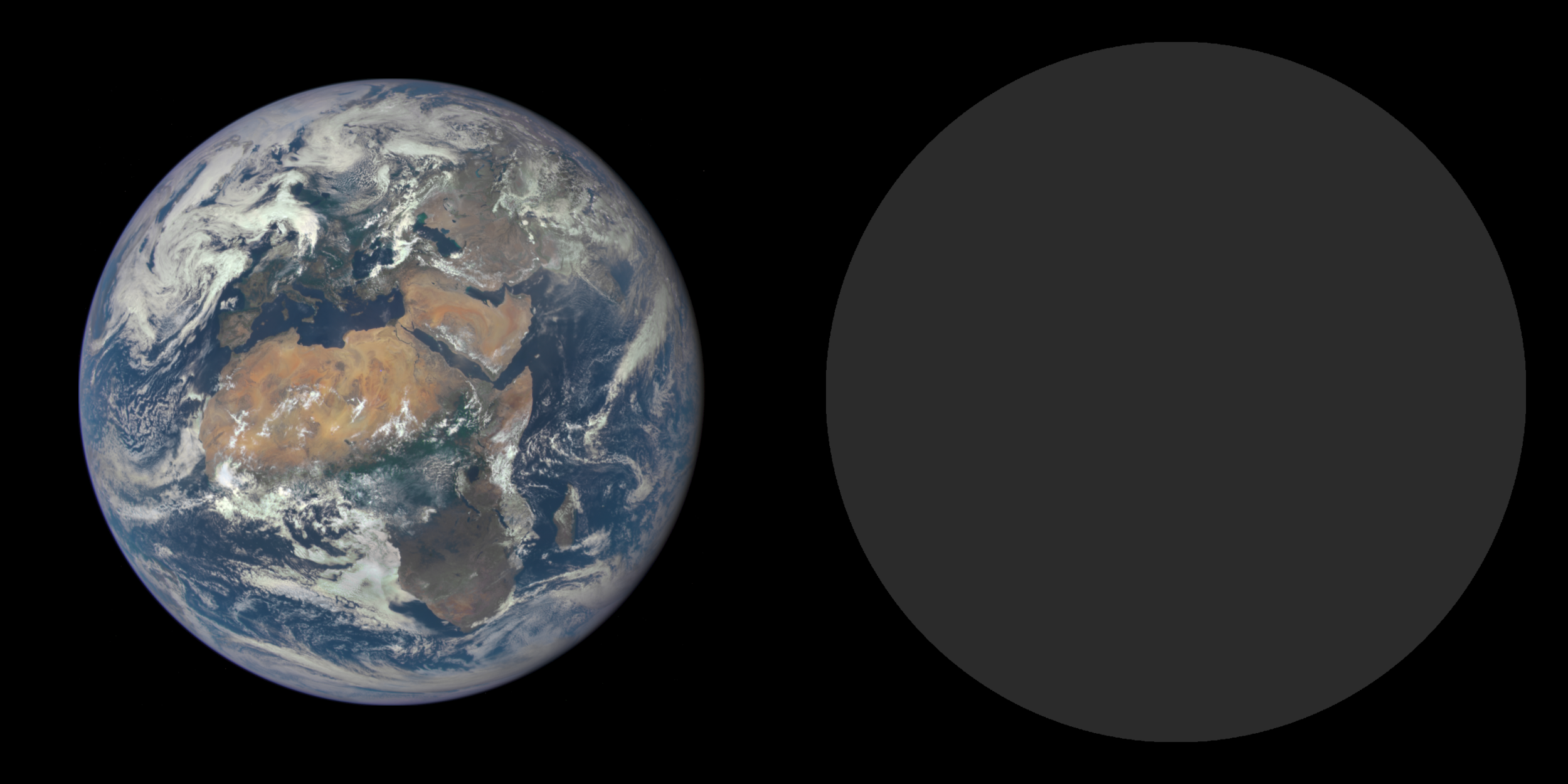
- Earth and TRAPPIST-1b compared

Discovery
- Discovered by: Michaël Gillon et al.
- Discovery site: TRAPPIST
- Discovery date: 2 May 2016
- Detection method: Transit

Orbital characteristics
- Semi-major axis: 0.01154 ± 0.00010 AU (1.726 ± 0.015 million km)
- Eccentricity: 0.00622±0.00304
- Orbital period (sidereal): 1.510826 ± 0.000006 d (36.25982 ± 0.00014 h)
- Inclination: 89.728°±0.165°
- Argument of periastron: 336.86°±34.24°
- Star: TRAPPIST-1

Physical characteristics
- Mean radius: 1.116+0.014 −0.012 R_{🜨}
- Mass: 1.374±0.069 M_{🜨}
- Mean density: 5.425+0.265 −0.272 g/cm^{3}
- Surface gravity: 1.102±0.052 g 10.80±0.51 m/s^{2}
- Albedo: 0.02±0.11 (Note: Best-fit gray albedo); 0.19±0.08
- Temperature: 397.6±3.8 K (124.5 °C; 256.0 °F, equilibrium); 424±28 K (151 °C; 304 °F, surface at 12.8 μm); 478±27 K (205 °C; 401 °F, surface at 15 μm)

Atmosphere
- Composition by volume: None or extremely thin CO_{2} (uncertain)

TRAPPIST-1b is a terrestrial, Earth-sized exoplanet orbiting around the ultra-cool red dwarf star TRAPPIST-1, located 40.7 light-years (12.5 parsecs) away from Earth in the constellation of Aquarius. The planet was detected using the transit method, where a planet dims the host star's light as it passes in front of it. It was first announced on May 2, 2016, and later studies were able to refine its physical parameters.

The planet is about 37% more massive than Earth and about 39% larger in volume; thus its density is very similar. It is the innermost of seven planets orbiting TRAPPIST-1, all of which are terrestrial, but is too close to its star to be in the habitable zone. Observations by the James Webb Space Telescope announced between 2023 and 2024 suggest that it is either airless or has a hazy CO_{2}-rich atmosphere. Its albedo is very low, making it dark in color.

== Physical characteristics ==
=== Mass, radius, and temperature ===
TRAPPIST-1b is very similar in both mass, radius, and gravity to Earth. It has a radius of 1.116 R_{🜨}, a mass of 1.374 M_{🜨}, and about 110% Earth's surface gravity. Initial estimates of the planet's density suggested that it is not entirely rocky; with a density of 3.98 g/cm^{3}, about ≤5% of its mass must be volatiles, likely in the form of a thick Venus-like atmosphere due to it receiving nearly four times more energy than Earth does. However, refined density estimates show that the planet is only slightly less dense than Earth.

Assuming the presence of an atmosphere, the planet's surface temperature was initially estimated to be between 750 K (477 °C; 890 °F) and 1,500 K (1,230 °C; 2,240 °F), potentially as high as 2,000 K (1,730 °C; 3,140 °F). This is much hotter than the surface of Venus and may be hot enough that the surface is molten lava. An observation of the secondary eclipse of TRAPPIST-1b by the James Webb Space Telescope, announced in 2023, suggests that the planet does not have any significant atmosphere, with a measured surface temperature of about 503 K (230 °C; 446 °F), and a low albedo. The planet may be very geologically active due to tidal squeezing similar to Jupiter's moon Io, which happens to have a similar orbital period and eccentricity (see TRAPPIST-1#Resonance and tides for references).

=== Orbit ===
TRAPPIST-1b orbits very close to its parent star. One orbit requires only, about 1.51 days (36 hours). It orbits about 0.0115 AU (1.72 million km; 1.07 million mi) from its star, just 1.2% the distance between Earth and the Sun. The close proximity to its host star means that TRAPPIST-1b is likely tidally locked. It also has a very circular orbit, with an eccentricity of 0.00622, significantly more circular than Earth's orbit, which has an eccentricity of 0.0167086. It is in 8:5 resonance with TRAPPIST-1c.

=== Host star ===
TRAPPIST-1b orbits the ultracool dwarf star TRAPPIST-1. It has a mass of 0.09 M_{☉} and is only 0.12 R_{☉}, with a surface temperature of 2,566 K (2,293 °C; 4,159 °F) and an age of 7.6 billion years old. The Sun, in comparison, has a surface temperature of 5,778 K (5,505 °C; 9,941 °F) and is about 4.6 billion years old. TRAPPIST-1 is also very dim, with a luminosity about 0.0005 times that of the Sun. It is too faint to be seen with the naked eye, having an apparent magnitude of 18.80.

=== Atmosphere ===
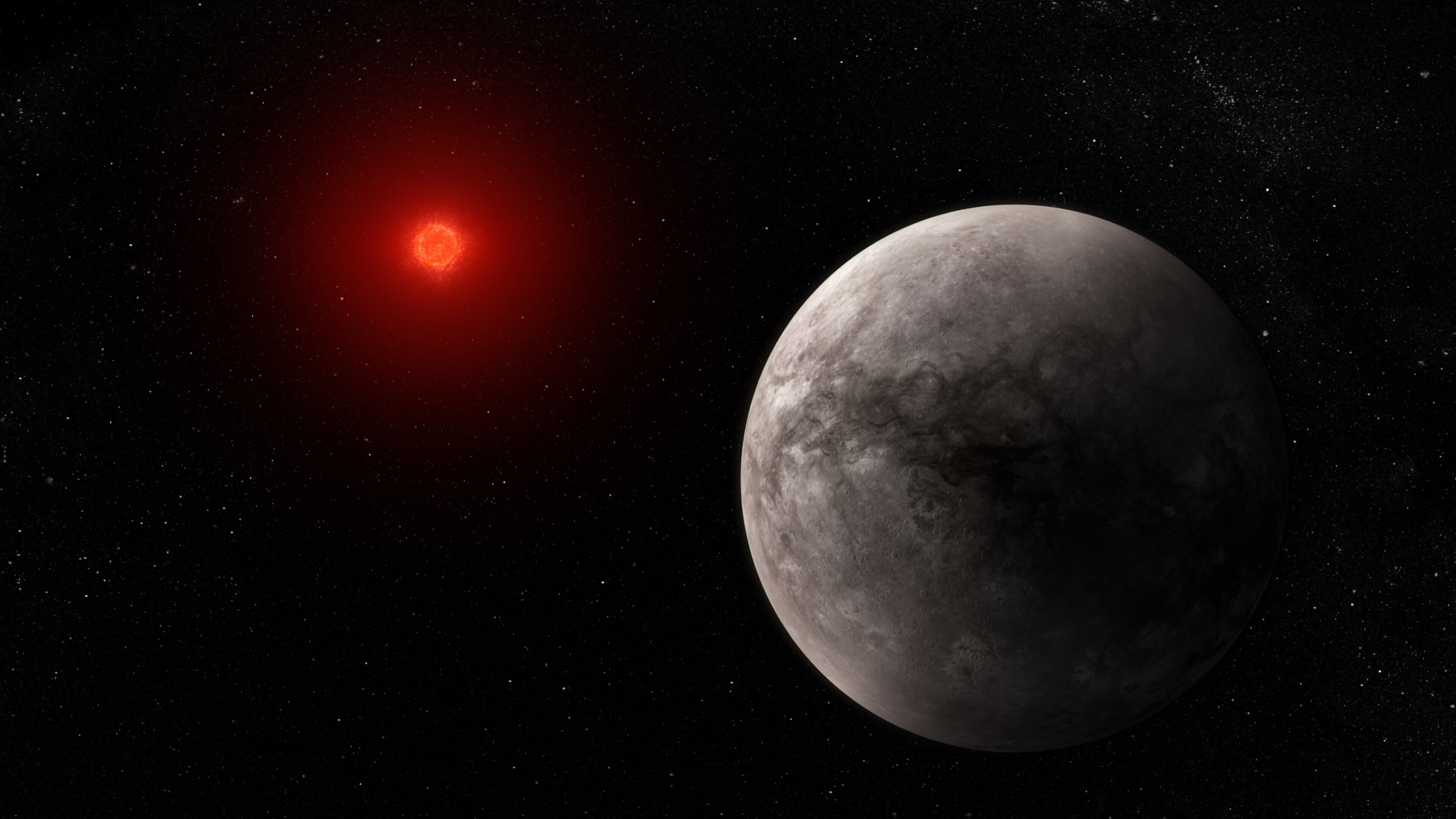
Artist's impression of TRAPPIST-1b (March 2023)

The combined transmission spectra of TRAPPIST-1 b and c rule out cloud-free hydrogen-dominated atmospheres for both planets, so they are unlikely to harbor extended gas envelopes. Also, no helium emission from TRAPPIST-1b has been detected. Prior to JWST observations, other atmospheres, from a cloud-free water-vapor atmosphere to a Venus-like atmosphere, remained consistent with the featureless spectra.

In 2018, the planet's atmosphere was better examined by the Spitzer Space Telescope and suggested to be quite large and hot, although the presence of an atmosphere could not be confirmed. The planet's transmission spectrum and refined density estimate suggested two main possibilities for the atmosphere: one rich in carbon dioxide, or one rich in water vapor. The more likely CO_{2} atmosphere would have a scale height of approximately 52 kilometers (32 miles) (Earth's being 8 km [5 mi], and Venus' at 15.9 km [9.9 mi]) and an average temperature in excess of 1,400 K (1,130 °C; 2,060 °F), far greater than the planet's equilibrium temperature of 397.6 K (124.5 °C; 256.0 °F). A water vapor atmosphere would need to have a scale height of >100 km (62 mi) and a temperature >1,800 K (1,530 °C; 2,780 °F) to produce the variations seen in the planet's transit depths and its transmission spectrum, and would be vulnerable to photodissociation where CO_{2} would not be. Other sources for the effects seen, such as hazes and thick clouds, would require an even larger atmosphere. TRAPPIST-1b will have to be studied further to confirm its potential large atmosphere.

An observation of the secondary eclipse of TRAPPIST-1b by the James Webb Space Telescope, announced in March 2023, suggested that the planet does not have any significant atmosphere. Atmospheres containing carbon dioxide with surface pressures greater than 0.1 bar can be ruled out at 3-sigma, and pressures greater than 0.01 bar at 1-sigma. Further studies of the exoplanet by transmission spectroscopy (primary eclipse), reported in September 2023, also confirmed the absence of a hydrogen-rich atmosphere, but due to stellar contamination were unable to determine the presence or absence of other types of atmospheres based on the transmission spectroscopy data alone. This does not affect the previous results based on emission spectroscopy.

Analysis of ten secondary eclipses observed by JWST published in December 2024, five in 12.8 μm and five in 15 μm, showed a shallower eclipse depth in the shorter wavelength that may be caused by photochemical hazes in a thick, CO_{2}-rich atmosphere. The presence of photochemical hazes in the atmosphere of TRAPPIST-1 b could create a thermal inversion that warms the upper atmosphere relative to the lower atmosphere, decreasing the infrared brightness temperature at 12.8 μm. The high UV flux of TRAPPIST-1 b would make for efficient photodissociation and photochemistry. However, it is unclear if such hazes can form in a hot, oxidized, CO_{2}-rich atmosphere. These results are also compatible with a young ultramafic surface and no atmosphere, which the authors of the 2024 paper slightly favor.

=== Geology ===
TRAPPIST-1 b has a low albedo of 0.19±0.08. The thermal emission at 12.8 μm and 15 μm best fits a surface composition of ultramafic rock (composed of 60% olivine and 40% enstatite). The difference in eclipse depths between the two wavelengths indicates the surface is geologically fresh (≤1,000 years) and not significantly impacted by space weathering. The presence of fresh ultramafic rock on TRAPPIST-1 b could indicate recent crustal reprocessing, from volcanic resurfacing or plate tectonics. A combination of tidal heating from the other six planets and induction heating from the large magnetic field of its host star should result in a substantial increase in volcanic activity, possibly making TRAPPIST-1 b comparable to Io with a young and crater-free volcanic surface.

== Gallery ==
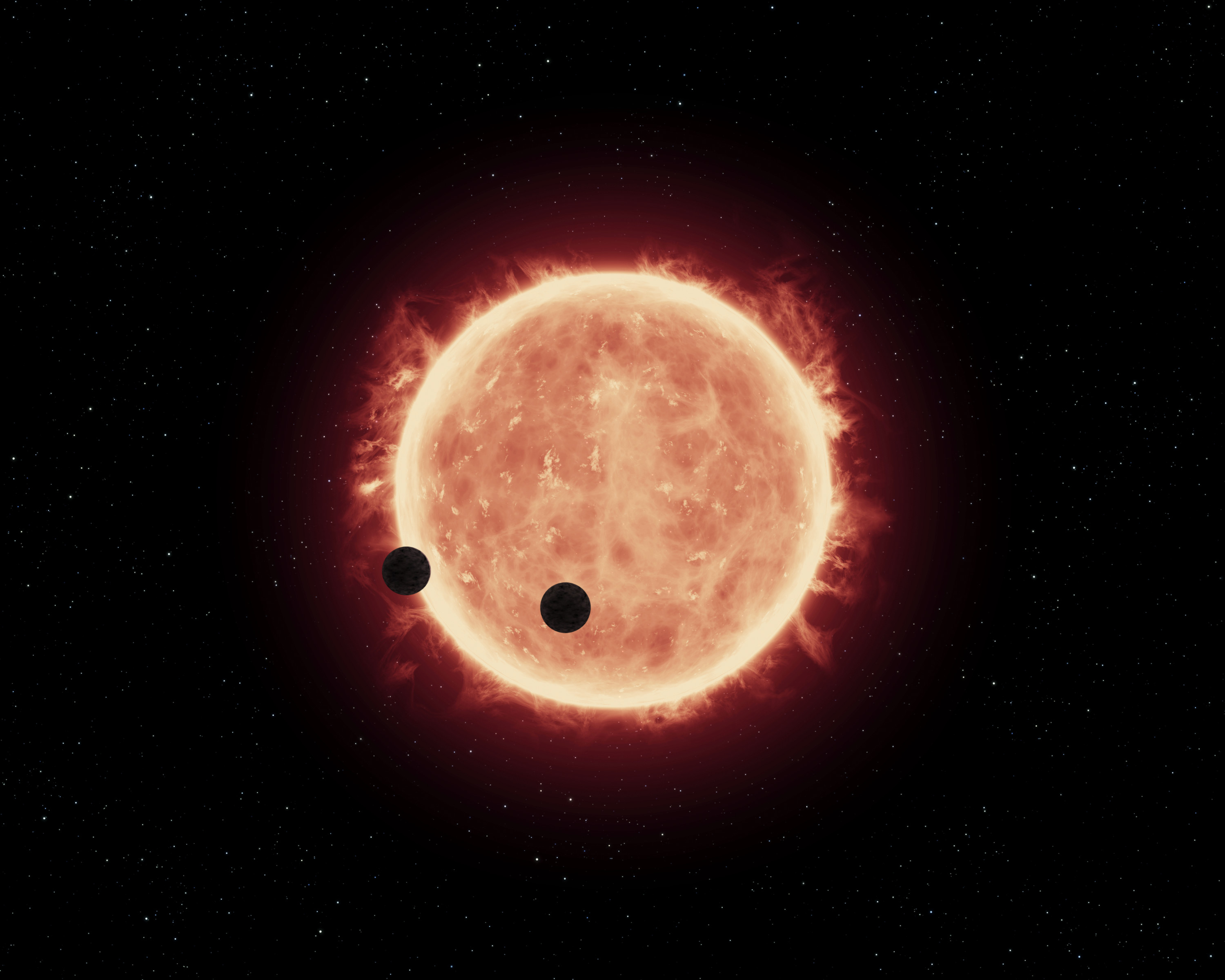
Artist's view of planets transiting red dwarf star in TRAPPIST-1 system

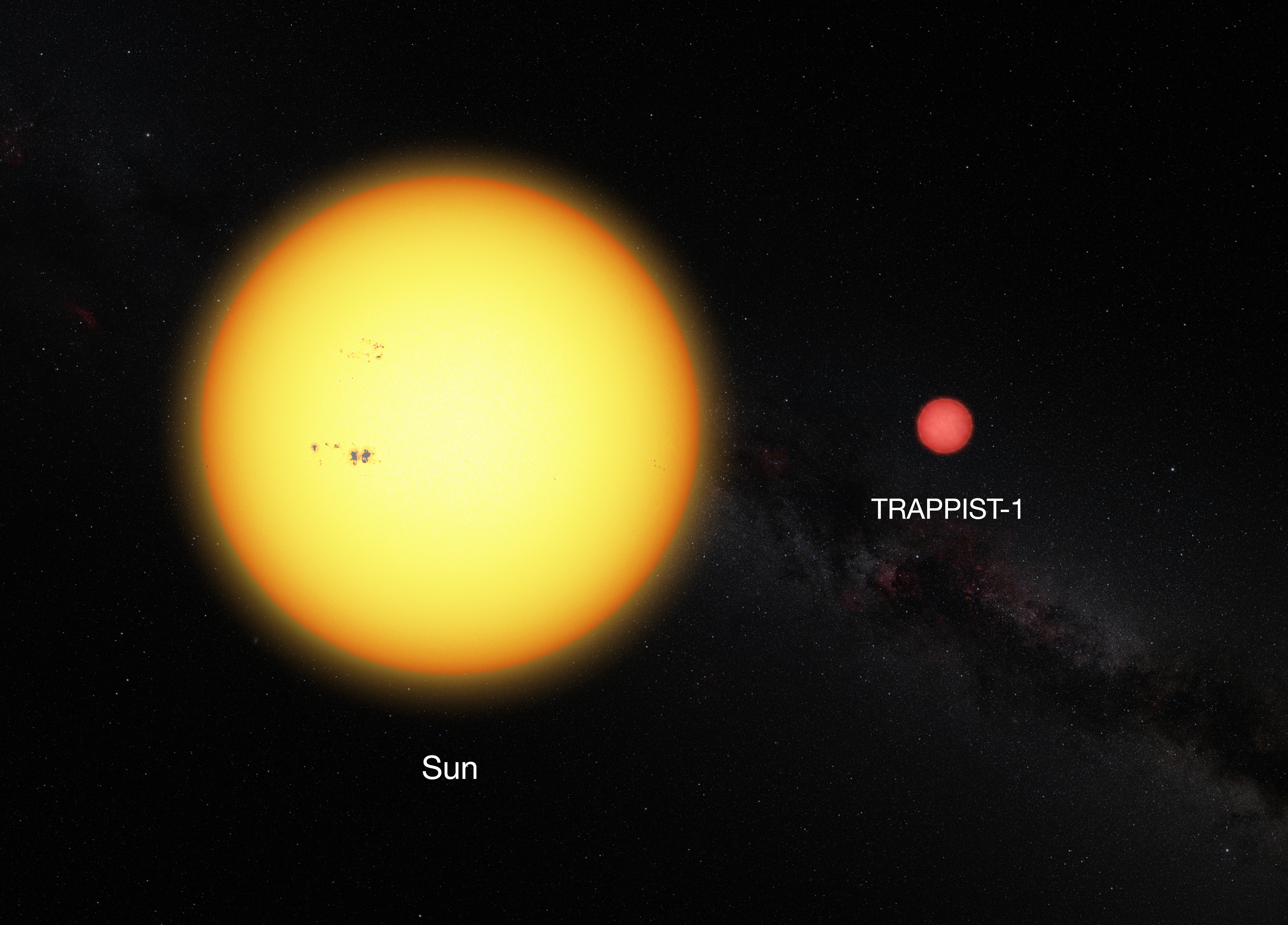
The Sun and the ultracool dwarf star TRAPPIST-1 to scale. The faint star has only 11% of the diameter of the Sun and is much redder in colour.

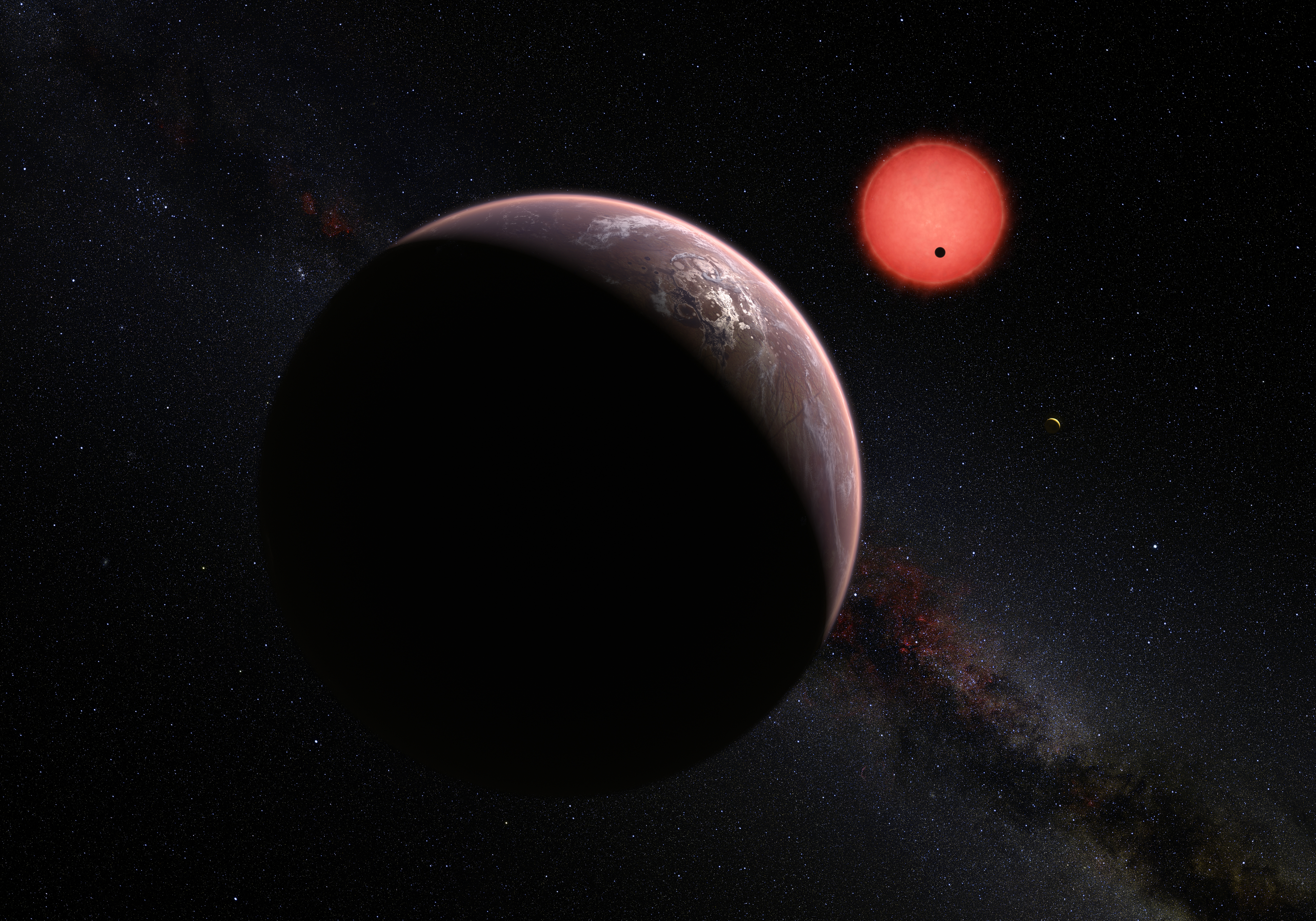
Artist's impression of three of the planets (b, c, and d) orbiting TRAPPIST-1

Artist's impression video, near one of the three planets orbiting TRAPPIST-1. One of the inner planets is shown in transit across the disc of its tiny and dim parent star.

== See also ==
- 55 Cancri e – a very hot planet with a confirmed atmosphere
- LHS 3844 b – a hot, rocky planet without an atmosphere
- List of terrestrial exoplanet candidates for atmosphere detection
