= LTT 1445 =

Star system in the constellation Eridanus

LTT 1445 A,BC
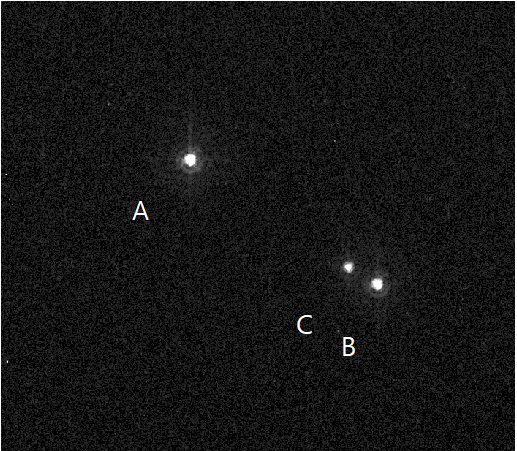
- Hubble ACS/HRC image showing all three stars. Upper left is LTT 1445 A and in the lower right part of the image is the LTT 1445 BC pair.

Observation data Epoch J2000.0 Equinox ICRS
- Constellation: Eridanus
- LTT 1445 A
- Right ascension: 03^{h} 01^{m} 51.39367^{s}
- Declination: −16° 35′ 36.0312″
- Apparent magnitude (V): 11.22±0.02
- LTT 1445 BC
- Right ascension: 03^{h} 01^{m} 51.04^{s}
- Declination: −16° 35′ 31.1″
- Apparent magnitude (V): 11.37±0.03

Characteristics
- Spectral type: M2.5+M3.0+M
- Variable type: flare star (A & C)

Astrometry

LTT 1445 A
Radial velocity (R_{v})	−5.74±0.33 km/s
Proper motion (μ)	RA: −369.972 mas/yr Dec.: −267.931 mas/yr
Parallax (π)	145.6922±0.0244 mas
Distance	22.387 ± 0.004 ly (6.864 ± 0.001 pc)

Orbit
Primary	LTT 1445 A
Secondary	LTT 1445 BC
Period (P)	216+14 −11 yr
Semi-major axis (a)	4.69+0.23 −0.19" (32.2 AU (Note: Semi-major axis in AU = $\frac{semimajor\ axis\ in\ seconds}{parallax}\ {{=}}\ \frac{4.69}{.1456922}$ = 32.2 AU; as the eccentricity is 0.56, the distance fluctuates between 44% and 156% of that, roughly from 14 AU to 50 AU.))
Eccentricity (e)	0.561+0.068 −0.072
Inclination (i)	87.27+0.29 −0.34°
Longitude of the node (Ω)	135.358+0.078 −0.069°
Periastron epoch (T)	2116.5+6.2 −5.0
Argument of periastron (ω) (secondary)	350.0±1.3°

Orbit
Primary	LTT 1445 B
Secondary	LTT 1445 C
Period (P)	36.2±5.3 yr
Semi-major axis (a)	1.159±0.076″
Eccentricity (e)	0.50±0.11
Inclination (i)	89.64±0.13°
Longitude of the node (Ω)	137.63±0.19°
Periastron epoch (T)	2019.2±1.7
Argument of periastron (ω) (secondary)	209±13°

Details

A
Mass	0.286±0.018 M_{☉}
Radius	0.271+0.019 −0.010 R_{☉}
Luminosity (bolometric)	0.00805±0.00035 L_{☉}
Surface gravity (log g)	4.967+0.061 −0.075 cgs
Temperature	3,337±150 K
Metallicity [Fe/H]	−0.34±0.08 dex

B
Mass	0.215±0.014 M_{☉}
Radius	0.236±0.027 R_{☉}

C
Mass	0.161±0.014 M_{☉}
Radius	0.197±0.027 R_{☉}
Rotation	1.4 d

Other designations
- BD−17 588, HIP 14101, WDS J03019-1633A,BC, IRAS 02595-1647, 2MASS J03015142-1635356, 2MASS J03015107-1635306, TIC 98796344, TOI-455, GJ 3192, GJ 3193

Database references
SIMBAD	The system
- A
- BC
Exoplanet Archive	data

LTT 1445 is a triple M-dwarf system 22.4 light-years (6.9 parsecs) distant in the constellation Eridanus. The primary LTT 1445 A hosts two exoplanets—one discovered in 2019 that transits the star every 5.36 days, and another found in 2021 that transits the star every 3.12 days, close to a 12:7 resonance. As of October 2022 it is the second closest transiting exoplanet system discovered, with the closest being HD 219134 bc.

== Stellar system ==
All three stars in the system are M-dwarfs, with masses between 0.16 M_{☉} and 0.26 M_{☉}. LTT 1445 A and LTT 1445 BC are separated by about 34 astronomical units and orbit each other with a period of about 250 years. The BC pair orbit each other about every 36 years in an eccentric orbit (e= ~0.5). The alignment of the three stars and the edge-on orbit of the BC pair suggests co-planarity of the system. The existence of transiting planets suggests that the entire system is co-planar, with orbits in one plane.

The TESS light curve showed stellar flares and rotational modulation due to starspots, likely on either the B or C component. Observations with Chandra showed that component C is the dominat X-ray source, with some contributions by component B. Flares are detected for component A in ultraviolet with Hubble and in x-rays with Chandra. Hubble observations also revealed an ultraviolet flare for component C, which was invisible at optical wavelengths.

== Planetary system ==
=== LTT 1445Ac ===
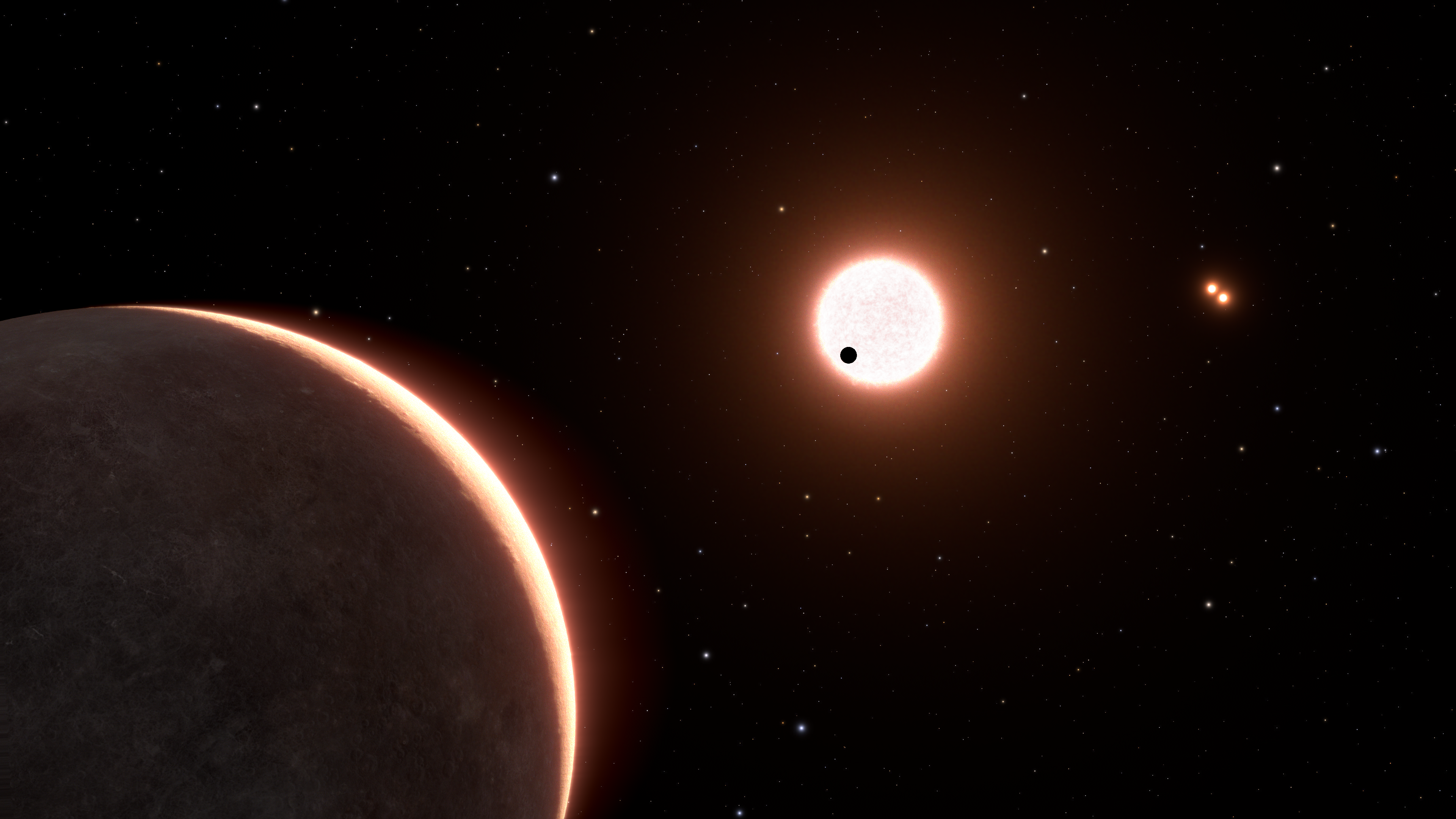
Artist's impression of the planet LTT 1445Ac, seen transiting the star, and its sibling LTT 1445Ab (foreground)

A second planet, LTT 1445Ac, was also found in 2021 on a 3.12 day orbital period, with a mass of 1.54+0.20
−0.19 Earth masses. Although it transits the star too, its smaller size made it difficult to detect before the radial velocity measurements, and still makes it difficult to estimate its exact size. The planets orbit near a 12:7 orbital resonance with one another - Ac orbiting 11.988 times for every 7 orbits Ab makes - oscillating one full orbit away from a 'perfect' resonance every 104 years. The planet's existence was independently confirmed in 2022.

In 2023, observations with the Hubble Space Telescope allowed a more precise determination of the planet's size, supporting a rocky composition for both planets. Its equilibrium temperature is 516±28 K (243 °C; 469 °F). In 2026, its dayside brightness temperature was found to be higher at 625+109
−79 K (352 °C; 665 °F). The presence of a Venus-like CO_{2}-rich atmosphere was ruled out with high confidence, while thin atmosphere-scenarios are still allowed by the observational data. It was found that tidal heating is likely not a crucial process presently for both planet Ac and Ab.

=== LTT 1445Ad ===
A third planetary candidate on a 24.3-day orbit, LTT 1445Ad, was found in 2022. This is a possibly rocky super-Earth orbiting within the habitable zone.

The LTT 1445 A planetary system
Companion (in order from star)	Mass	Semimajor axis (AU)	Orbital period (days)	Eccentricity	Inclination (°)	Radius
c	1.37±0.19 M_{🜨}	0.02659+0.00047 −0.00049	3.1238994	<0.223	87.46+0.13 −0.21	1.07+0.10 −0.07 R_{🜨}
b	2.73+0.25 −0.23 M_{🜨}	0.03810+0.00067 −0.00070	5.3587635	<0.110	89.53+0.33 −0.40	1.34+0.11 −0.06 R_{🜨}
d (unconfirmed)	≥2.72±0.75 M_{🜨}	0.09±0.02	24.30+0.03 −0.08	—	—	—

== See also ==
- List of star systems within 20–25 light-years
- List of nearest exoplanets
- EZ Aquarii nearby M-dwarf triple
- GJ 1245 nearby M-dwarf triple
- Gliese 667 Cc
