= GJ 1132 =

Star in the constellation Vela

Observation data Epoch J2000 Equinox ICRS
- Constellation: Vela
- Right ascension: 10^{h} 14^{m} 51.77869^{s}
- Declination: −47° 09′ 24.1928″
- Apparent magnitude (V): 13.46

Characteristics
- Evolutionary stage: Main sequence
- Spectral type: M4V

Astrometry
Radial velocity (R_{v})	34.66±0.48 km/s
Proper motion (μ)	RA: −1,054.201 mas/yr Dec.: +414.512 mas/yr
Parallax (π)	79.3206±0.0182 mas
Distance	41.119 ± 0.009 ly (12.607 ± 0.003 pc)

Details
Mass	0.198±0.005 M_{☉}
Radius	0.226±0.007 R_{☉}
Luminosity	0.00436±0.00013 L_{☉}
Surface gravity (log g)	5.02±0.03 cgs
Temperature	3,196±71 K
Metallicity [Fe/H]	−0.18±0.15 dex
Rotation	122.3+6.0 −5.0 d

Other designations
- RAVE J101451.9-470925, GJ 1132, L 320-124, LFT 707, LHS 281, LTT 3758, NLTT 23819, PM 10129-4655, PM J10148-4709, GCRV 26265, 2MASS J10145184-4709244, WISEA J101450.66-470919.7, Gaia DR2 5413438219396893568

Database references
SIMBAD	data
Exoplanet Archive	data

GJ 1132 is a small red dwarf star 41.1 light-years (12.6 parsecs) away from Earth in the constellation Vela. In 2015, it was revealed to have a hot rocky Earth-sized planet orbiting it every 1.6 days. In 2018, a second planet and a potential third were revealed.

== Planetary system ==
As of June 12, 2018, there are two confirmed exoplanets and one candidate exoplanet orbiting GJ 1132.

=== GJ 1132 b ===
GJ 1132 b is the innermost planet of the GJ 1132 system, as well as the smallest. It is very similar in size and mass to Earth, with a radius of 1.13 R_{🜨} and a mass of 1.66 M_{🜨}. It is slightly denser than Earth with 30% more surface gravity, meaning it has a rocky composition. Despite its physical similarities to Earth, it is considered too hot to be habitable, getting 19 times more sunlight due to its 1.6 day orbital period. As of 2022, it remains unclear whether the planet has an atmosphere, with some studies finding evidence for an atmosphere, but others finding a flat, featureless spectrum that leaves the presence or absence of an atmosphere inconclusive.

=== GJ 1132 c ===
GJ 1132 c was reported by Bonfils and colleagues using the HARPS spectrograph on the ESO 3.6 m Telescope at the La Silla Observatory in Chile in June 2018. No transits of the planet were found, but it has a minimum mass of about 2.6 M_{🜨} and gets 1.9 times the amount of sunlight as Earth with an equilibrium temperature of 300 K (27 °C; 80 °F). It orbits outside the inner limit of GJ 1132's habitable zone (which ends at 1.6 times the stellar flux of Earth), but because the exact characteristics of the planet's atmosphere are unknown, it has been mentioned that it could still be potentially habitable. However, with a lack of transits, determining its atmospheric characteristics will be extremely difficult.

=== GJ 1132 d ===
An unconfirmed cold super-Earth candidate was also detected, with a minimum mass of about 8.4 M_{🜨} and a low equilibrium temperature of 111 K (−162 °C; −260 °F). It has been designated GJ 1132 (d) with parenthesis because it is not considered a confirmed planet. Despite the signal having a false alarm probability of less than 0.01%, comparable to GJ 1132 b and c, it is close to the period of the star's magnetic cycle.

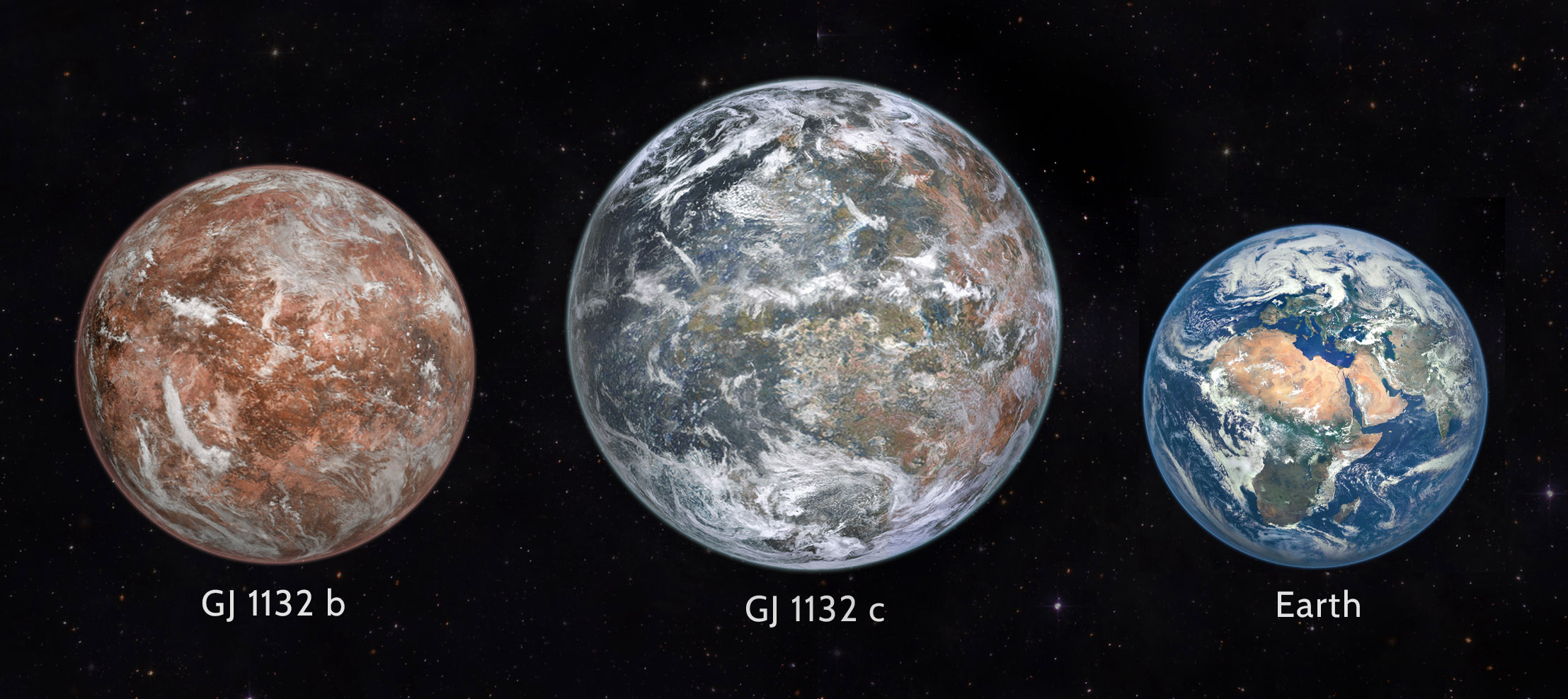
Artist's impression and size comparison of the two confirmed planets of GJ 1132 with Earth

The GJ 1132 planetary system
Companion (in order from star)	Mass	Semimajor axis (AU)	Orbital period (days)	Eccentricity	Inclination (°)	Radius
b	1.69±0.15 M_{🜨}	0.0153 ± 0.0005	1.6289304(13)	<0.22	86.58 ± 0.63	1.22±0.04 R_{🜨}
c	>2.91±0.27 M_{🜨}	0.0476 ± 0.0017	8.929 ± 0.010	<0.27	—	—
d (unconfirmed)	>8.4 ^{+1.7}_{−2.5} M_{🜨}	0.35 ± 0.01	176.9 ± 5.1	<0.53	—	—

== See also ==
- Wolf 1061
