= Maritza Soto =

Chilean astronomer

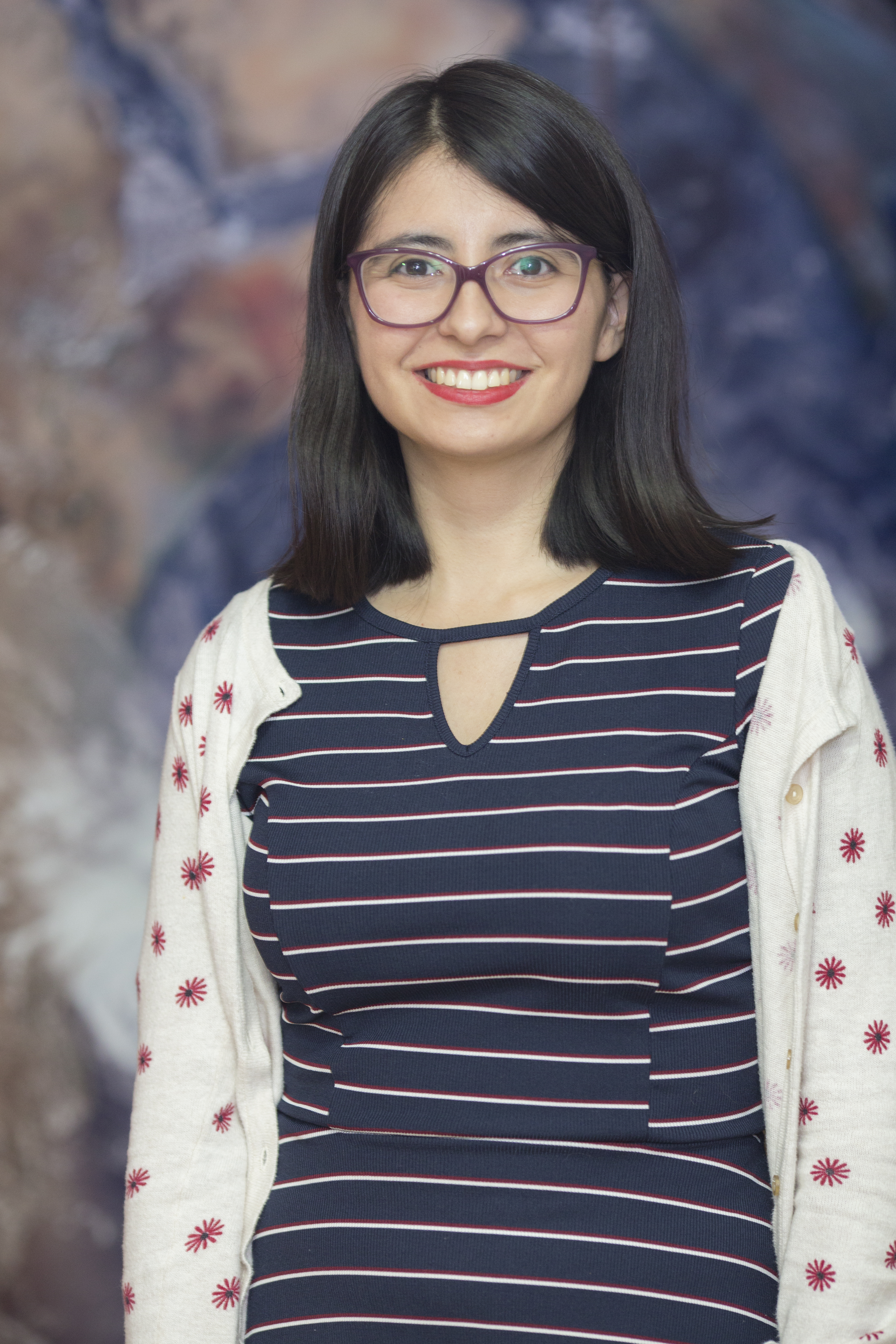
- Born: Maritza Soto Vásquez; 1990 (age 35–36)
- Education: University of Chile
- Occupation: Astronomer

Maritza Soto Vásquez (born 1990) is a Chilean astronomer who discovered the exoplanets HD 110014 c, K2-237b, and K2-238b.

== Career ==
On 19 August 2015, Soto confirmed the existence of exoplanet HD 110014 c. From La Silla Observatory, she discovered a planet 293 light-years away from Earth which orbits the red giant HD 110014 – Chi Virginis of the constellation Virgo. The planet, which has a mass three times that of Jupiter, was named HD 110014 c, following international terminology. Although it had been detected in 2004 and 2011, Soto was the first to check and annotate the data to prove its existence.

As a postdoctoral researcher and leader of a team of astronomers at the Queen Mary University of London, in the summer of 2018 Soto unveiled the discovery of two gaseous exoplanets orbiting different stars, K2-237b and K2-238b, both larger than Jupiter. K2-237b orbits its star every two days, while K2-238b orbits every three days. A paper about K2-237b and K2-238b was published with Soto as the first author in the Monthly Notices of the Royal Astronomical Society. K2-237b is a highly inflated hot Jupiter and orbits a relative bright star, making it a target for follow-up studies.

== Recognitions ==
In September 2018, Soto was nominated for the Natida Chileno del Año 2018 award, an initiative to recognize Chileans who excel in different areas.
