= LHS 3844 =

Star in the constellation Indus

LHS 3844 / Batsũ̀
Observation data Epoch J2000 Equinox ICRS
- Constellation: Indus
- Right ascension: 22^{h} 41^{m} 58.11718^{s}
- Declination: −69° 10′ 08.3207″
- Apparent magnitude (V): 15.26±0.03

Characteristics
- Evolutionary stage: Main sequence
- Spectral type: M4.5-M5
- Apparent magnitude (V): 15.26±0.03
- Apparent magnitude (G): 13.365±0.003
- Apparent magnitude (J): 10.046±0.023
- Apparent magnitude (H): 9.477±0.023
- Apparent magnitude (K): 9.145±0.023

Astrometry
Radial velocity (R_{v})	−9.90±0.76 km/s
Proper motion (μ)	RA: +334.419 mas/yr Dec.: −726.986 mas/yr
Parallax (π)	67.2123±0.0187 mas
Distance	48.53 ± 0.01 ly (14.878 ± 0.004 pc)
Absolute magnitude (M_{V})	14.39±0.02

Details
Mass	0.151±0.014 M_{☉}
Radius	0.189±0.006 R_{☉}
Luminosity (bolometric)	0.00272±0.0004 L_{☉}
Surface gravity (log g)	5.06±0.01 cgs
Temperature	3080±50 K
Metallicity [Fe/H]	+0.22±0.1 dex
Rotation	130.0+16.9 −13.4 d
Age	7.8±1.6 Gyr

Other designations
- Batsũ̀, L 119-213, LFT 1732, LHS 3844, NLTT 54534, TOI-136, TIC 410153553, 2MASS J22415815-6910089, WISEA J224158.77-691015.9

Database references
SIMBAD	data
Exoplanet Archive	data

LHS 3844, also named Batsũ̀ (Bribri pronunciation: [băˈtsṹ]), is a red dwarf star located 48.5 light-years (14.9 parsecs) away from the Solar System in the constellation of Indus. The star has about 15% the mass and 19% the radius of the Sun. It is a relatively inactive red dwarf with a slow rotation period of about 128 days, though UV flares have been observed. LHS 3844 is orbited by one known exoplanet.

== Nomenclature ==
The designation LHS 3844 comes from the Luyten Half-Second Catalogue of stars with high proper motion.

In August 2022, this planetary system was included among 20 systems to be named by the third NameExoWorlds project. The approved names, proposed by a team from Costa Rica, were announced in June 2023. LHS 3844 is named Batsũ̀ and its planet is named Kuaꞌkua, after the Bribri words for "hummingbird" and "butterfly".

== Planetary system ==
The exoplanet LHS 3844 b (later named Kuaꞌkua) was discovered in 2018 using TESS. It is a terrestrial planet 30% larger than Earth with an orbital period of less than a day, and likely does not have an atmosphere. Its low albedo suggests that its surface may resemble that of the Moon or Mercury. Observations made with the James Webb Space Telescope confirm this hypothesis. The data ruled out the presence of an atmosphere and an Earth-like crust composed of silica-rich rock such as granite. Instead, the material is likely to be around 1000 Kelvin in temperature and resembles basalt or mantle material. The absence of gaseous sulphur dioxide and carbon dioxide indicates no recent geological activity. The researchers therefore conclude that because of space weathering, the surface consists of powdery material similar to regolith.

The planet's mass was measured in 2026, along with tentative evidence of a possible second planet.

The LHS 3844 planetary system
Companion (in order from star)	Mass	Semimajor axis (AU)	Orbital period (days)	Eccentricity	Inclination (°)	Radius
b / Kuaꞌkua	2.27±0.23 or 2.37±0.25 M_{🜨}	0.00624+0.00019 −0.00020	0.46292971(4)	—	88.90+0.74 −0.65	1.286+0.043 −0.044 R_{🜨}
c (unconfirmed)	≥2.56+0.27 −0.26 M_{🜨}	—	6.8758+0.0057 −0.0035	—	—	—
