= LHS 1478 =

Red dwarf star in the Serpens constellation

Observation data Epoch J2000 Equinox ICRS
- Constellation: Cassiopeia
- Right ascension: 02^{h} 57^{m} 18.25955^{s}
- Declination: +76° 33′ 11.2535″
- Apparent magnitude (V): 13.3

Characteristics
- Evolutionary stage: main sequence
- Spectral type: M3V

Astrometry
| Radial velocity (R_{v}) | +69.79±0.27 km/s |
| Proper motion (μ) | RA: +690.920 mas/yr Dec.: −399.894 mas/yr |
| Parallax (π) | 54.9036±0.0177 mas |
| Distance | 59.41 ± 0.02 ly (18.214 ± 0.006 pc) |
| Absolute magnitude (M_{V}) | +12.1 |

Details
| Mass | 0.236±0.012 M_{☉} |
| Radius | 0.246±0.008 R_{☉} |
| Luminosity | 0.00715±0.00012 L_{☉} |
| Surface gravity (log g) | 4.87±0.06 cgs |
| Temperature | 3381±54 K |
| Metallicity [Fe/H] | −0.13±0.19 dex |
| Rotation | ~6.4 d |
| Rotational velocity (v sin i) | <2 km/s |

Other designations
- G 245-61, LHS 1478, LP 14-53, NLTT 9256, TOI-1640, TIC 396562848

Database references
| SIMBAD | data |
| Exoplanet Archive | data |

LHS 1478 (also known as TOI-1640) is a M3V-type main sequence star located 59.4 light-years from Earth in the constellation of Cassiopeia. It has a mass of 0.24 solar masses and a radius of 0.25 solar radii. It has an effective temperature of 3381 Kelvin. The star is fairly inactive with no major flaring activity.

== Planetary system ==
There is currently only one known exoplanet orbiting around the star named LHS 1478 b. It is a hot super-Earth with a mass of 2.33 Earths and a radius of 1.24 Earths. It has an equilibrium temperature of about ~595 K. James Webb Space Telescope observations disfavor the possibility of a low-albedo bare rock, suggesting that the planet either has an atmosphere or a high albedo.

The LHS 1478 planetary system
| Companion (in order from star) | Mass | Semimajor axis (AU) | Orbital period (days) | Eccentricity | Inclination (°) | Radius |
|---|---|---|---|---|---|---|
| b | 2.33±0.20 M_{🜨} | 0.01848+0.00061 −0.00063 | 1.9495378(41) | — | 87.452+0.052 −0.048 | 1.242+0.051 −0.049 R_{🜨} |
