= LHS 3844 b =

Exoplanet in the constellation Indus

LHS 3844 b / Kuaꞌkua
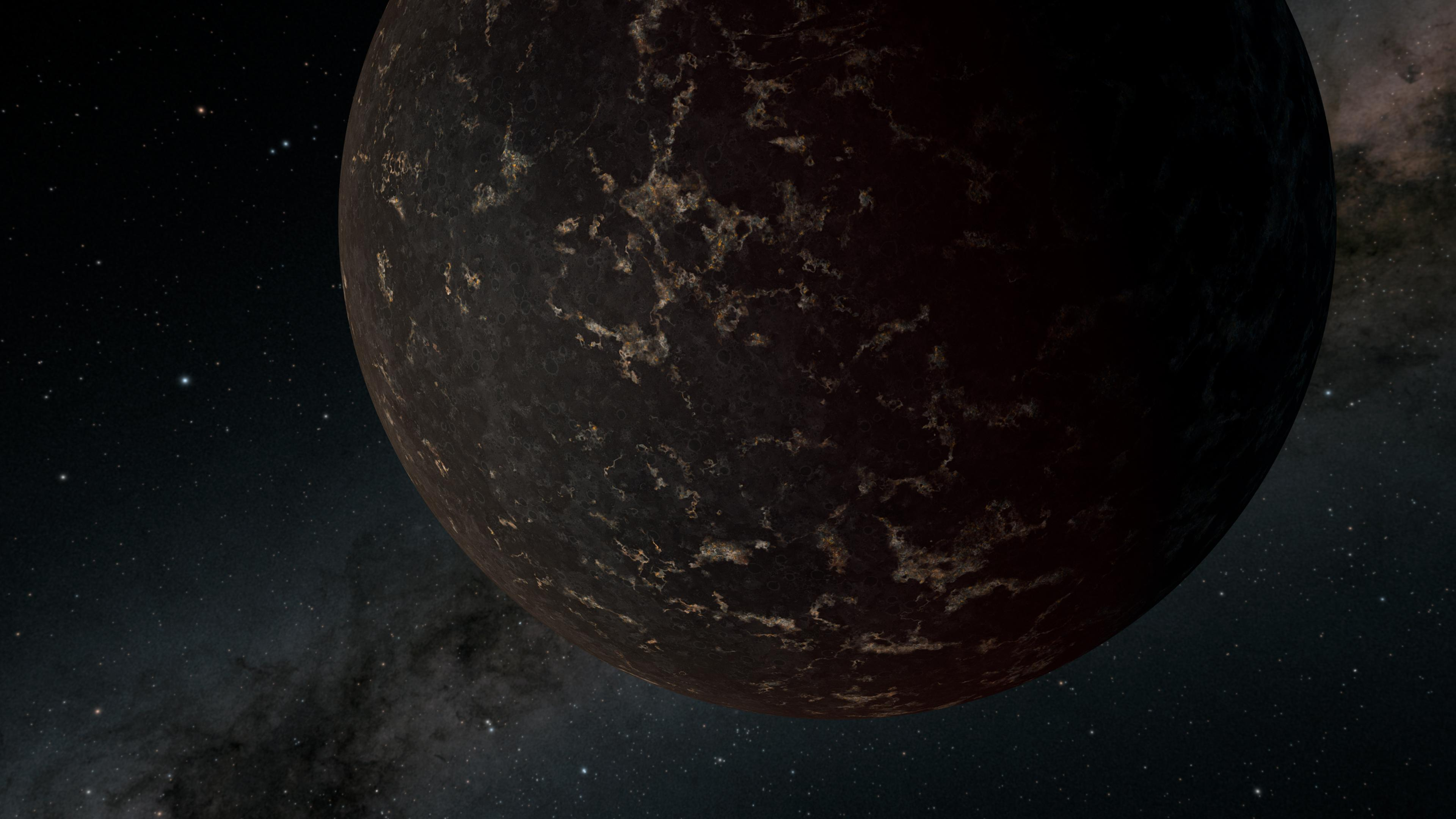
- Artist’s illustration of LHS 3844 b

Discovery
- Discovered by: Vanderspek et al.
- Discovery date: September 2018
- Detection method: Transit

Designations
- Alternative names: Kuaꞌkua, TOI-136.01, TOI-136 b, TIC 410153553 b

Orbital characteristics
- Semi-major axis: 0.00624+0.00019 −0.00020 au
- Orbital period (sidereal): 0.462929709+0.000000044 −0.000000042 d
- Inclination: 88.90+0.74 −0.65
- Star: LHS 3844

Physical characteristics
- Mean radius: 1.286+0.043 −0.044 R_{🜨}
- Mass: 2.27±0.23 M_{🜨} or 2.37±0.25 M_{🜨}
- Mean density: 5.67±0.65 or 6.15+0.60 −0.61 g/cm^{3}
- Albedo: 0.14+0.13 −0.14
- Temperature: 985 K (712 °C; 1,313 °F) (dayside)

LHS 3844 b, formally named Kuaꞌkua (Bribri pronunciation: [kwaʔkwa]), is an exoplanet orbiting the red dwarf star LHS 3844, about 48.5 light-years (14.9 parsecs) away in the constellation Indus. It was discovered in 2018 using the Transiting Exoplanet Survey Satellite.

LHS 3844 b is an ultra-short period planet which orbits its parent star once every 11 hours, and is around 1.3 Earth radii in size. It has an old, low albedo surface likely composed of olivine-rich materials such as basalt, resembling that of the Moon or Mercury. It does not have a thick atmosphere capable of distributing heat from the dayside to the nightside, resulting in a dayside temperature of about 1,000 K (730 °C; 1,340 °F) and a nightside temperature consistent with absolute zero.

== History ==
=== Discovery ===
Between the 25th of July to the 22nd of August 2018, the Transiting Exoplanet Survey Satellite (TESS) observed LHS 3844 (Batsũ̀). A transit was detected and follow up observations were made as part of the TESS Follow-up Observing Program (TFOO) where a full transit was observed on the 6th of September 2018. Transits of LHS 3844 b were also detected by the El Sauce Observatory Planewave CSK14 telescope located in El Sauce, Chile and the Cerro Tololo International Observatory (CTIO). The star has been observed using the ground-based MEarth-South telescope array as part of normal survey operations. LHS 3844 was photometrically observed a total of 1935 times between the January 10th 2016 and August 25, 2018 with no transits being detected.

Because not all transit signals are produced by exoplanets, several scenarios had to be considered and ruled out to validate the transit. The signal was likely not an artifact of the instrument because several space and ground-based telescopes had observed the same transits. It was also not likely due to an eclipsing binary because variations placed on the upper limit on radial-velocity corresponding to a companion with a mass of 0.96 Jupiters which would have been detectable. The possibility of LHS 3844 being a binary star system having the companion producing false-positives have also been ruled out. This is because the star would have to be very faint and orbits very close to the star to escape detection. The high proper motion of LHS 3844 also rules out the possibility that the transit signal was produced from a distant star with a transiting exoplanet. This scenario has been ruled out because the high motion star relative to background stars would allow for faint background stars to be checked for signals from previous images.

=== Naming ===
In August 2022, this planet and its host star were included among 20 systems to be named by the third NameExoWorlds project. The approved names, proposed by a team from Costa Rica, were announced in June 2023. LHS 3844 b is named Kuaꞌkua and its host star is named Batsũ̀, after the Bribri words for "butterfly" and "hummingbird".

== Characteristics ==
=== Mass and radius ===
The radius of LHS 3844 b can be determined using transit photometry and was determined during its initial discovery. It shows that LHS 3844 b has a radius of around 1.286 Earth radii. The mass of this planet was determined using doppler spectroscopy which reveals a mass ranging between 2.27 ± 0.23 to 2.37 ± 0.25 Earth masses making it a super-Earth. The planet's bulk density can be derived from the mass and radius values of LHS 3844 b. It shows that the planet has a bulk density that is approximately 6 g/cm^{3}. The density is consistent with LHS 3844 b having a dry, Earth-like composition.

=== Orbit and rotation ===
LHS 3844 b orbits around its host star at a distance of around 0.00624 au, taking around 11 hours (0.462 days) to complete an orbit around its star. This makes LHS 3844 b an ultra-short period (USP) planet. The planet's orbit is circular, and is oriented edge-on relative to Earth, allowing it to pass in front of the star when seen from Earth.

Because LHS 3844 b has no atmosphere, it makes it ideal for constraining the rotation of the planet. Observation show that this planet does not have strong tidal heating which would be expected if its spin is not synchronized with its orbital period. This means that LHS 3844 b is tidally locked. This makes it the first exoplanet confirmed to be tidally locked having a permanent dark side.

=== Atmosphere ===
LHS 3844 b does not have a thick atmosphere, as indicated by the lack of temperature redistribution from dayside to nightside and transmission spectroscopy favoring a flat, featureless spectrum, and disfavoring clear atmospheres of hydrogen/helium or water with surface pressures over 0.1 bar. Subsequent observations also disfavor concentrations of carbon dioxide or sulfur dioxide down to 0.1 bar. Thinner atmospheres are expected to be susceptible to escape, suggesting that LHS 3844 b may entirely lack an atmosphere. In order to explain the lack of atmosphere, the planet may have formed interior to the system snow line, accreting volatile-poor materials, and failing to produce a sufficiently thick atmosphere to avoid complete erosion. High velocity impacts are also capable of eroding the atmosphere.

=== Surface ===
Thermal emission spectroscopic observations suggest that the surface of LHS 3844 b is old and very dark. The Bond albedo of the surface is around 0.14 which is similar to the surface of the Moon or Mercury. The surface composition is consistent with ultramafic or mafic materials with low silica content, ruling out felsic rocks like granite. These materials are likely rich in basalt or other olivine-rich materials. The surface is likely highly space-weathered.

The absence of volcanic gases such as carbon dioxide and sulfur dioxide, even in trace amounts, show that the planet does not have geologic activity.

== See also ==
- List of exoplanets discovered in 2019
- Gliese 367 b
- Gliese 486 b
- TRAPPIST-1b
- L 168-9 b
