= LHS 475 =

Red dwarf star in the constellation Octans

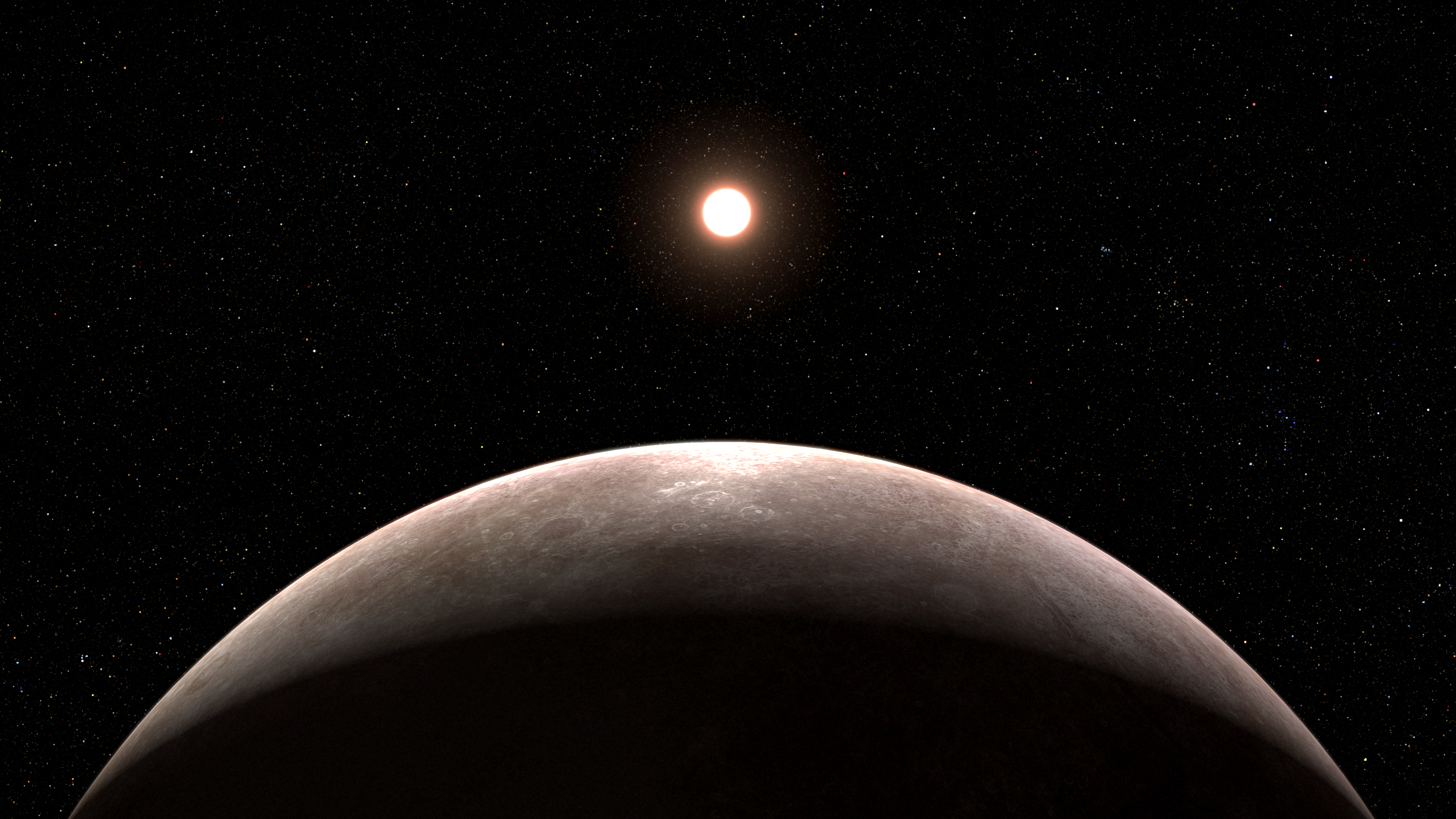
- Artist's impression of LHS 475 b and its host star

Observation data Epoch J2000 Equinox J2000
- Constellation: Octans
- Right ascension: 19^{h} 20^{m} 54.37612^{s}
- Declination: −82° 33′ 16.1679″
- Apparent magnitude (V): 12.69

Characteristics
- Evolutionary stage: Main sequence
- Spectral type: M3.5V
- Apparent magnitude (V): 12.69±0.03
- Apparent magnitude (G): 11.413±0.003
- Apparent magnitude (J): 8.555±0.030
- Apparent magnitude (H): 8.004±0.038
- Apparent magnitude (K): 7.686±0.042

Astrometry
Radial velocity (R_{v})	−10.59±0.24 km/s
Proper motion (μ)	RA: +342.300 mas/yr Dec.: −1230.297 mas/yr
Parallax (π)	80.1134±0.0206 mas
Distance	40.71 ± 0.01 ly (12.482 ± 0.003 pc)

Details
Mass	0.274±0.015 M_{☉}
Radius	0.2789±0.0014 R_{☉}
Luminosity (bolometric)	0.00862±0.00039 L_{☉}
Surface gravity (log g)	4.964±0.046 cgs
Temperature	3289±83 K
Rotation	79.317 d

Other designations
- GJ 4102, L 22-69, LFT 1458, LHS 475, LTT 7606, NLTT 47504, PM J19209-8233, TOI-910, TIC 369327947, 2MASS J19205439-8233170

Database references
SIMBAD	data
Exoplanet Archive	data
ARICNS	data

LHS 475 is a red dwarf star located 40.7 light-years (12.5 parsecs) away from the Solar System in the constellation of Octans. It hosts one known exoplanet.

== Planetary system ==
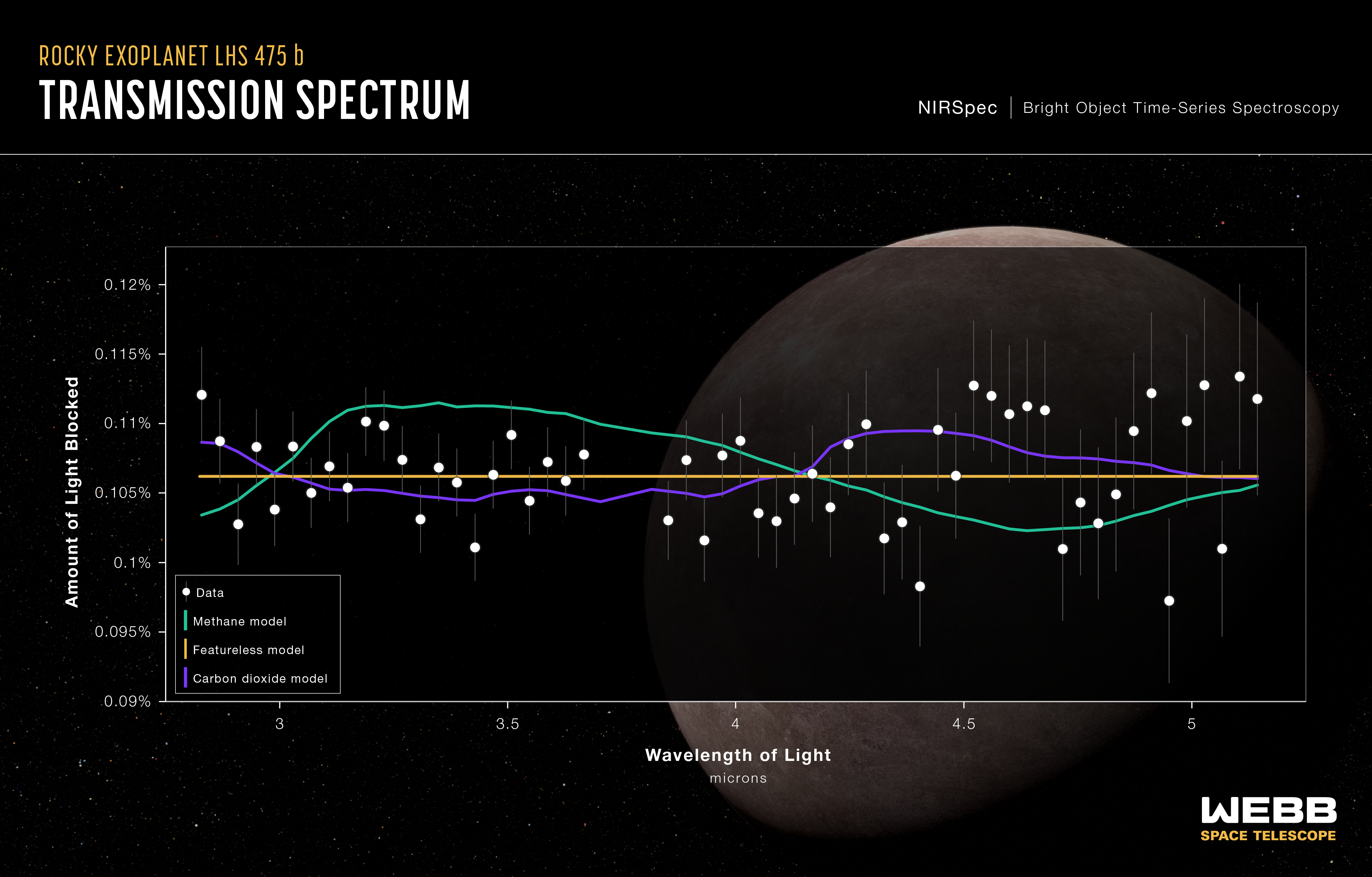
Transmission spectrum of LHS 475 b from NIRSpec

The exoplanet LHS 475 b was initially found in transit data from TESS, and its confirmation using the NIRSpec instrument of the James Webb Space Telescope, which also observed its transmission spectrum, was published in January 2023. Another independent confirmation of the planet was published on arXiv in April 2023, and a year later accepted to the Astronomical Journal.

The JWST data is consistent with a featureless spectrum, as would be expected of a planet with no atmosphere, but is also consistent with some types of atmosphere, such as a thin carbon dioxide-dominated atmosphere like that of Mars, or an atmosphere obscured by a thick cloud deck such as that of Venus. Other atmospheric compositions, such as a methane-dominated atmosphere, are ruled out by this spectrum.

LHS 475 b is close in size to Earth, at 99% its diameter, but is much hotter, with an equilibrium temperature of 586 K (313 °C; 595 °F). Assuming the planet has little to no atmosphere, its dayside temperature is estimated at 748 K (475 °C; 887 °F). The planet completes an orbit around its star in just two days and is likely tidally locked.

The LHS 475 planetary system
Companion (in order from star)	Mass	Semimajor axis (AU)	Orbital period (days)	Eccentricity	Inclination (°)	Radius
b	0.914±0.187 (Note: The mass of this planet has not been measured; this value is an estimate.) M_{🜨}	0.02037(37)	2.0291010(17)	0	87.38±0.19	0.991±0.050 R_{🜨}
