= Gram per cubic centimetre =

CGS unit of density

gram per cubic centimetre
- Density of the cube: 1 g/cm^{3}

General information
- Unit system: CGS unit
- Unit of: Density
- Symbol: g/cm^{3}

Conversions
1 g/cm^{3} in ...	... is equal to ...
- SI units: 1,000 kg/m^{3}
- Imperial and US Customary units: 62.42796 lb/cu ft
- MTS units: 1 t/m^{3}

The gram per cubic centimetre is a unit of density in International System of Units (SI), and is commonly used in chemistry. Its official SI symbols are g/cm^{3}, g·cm^{−3}, or g cm^{−3}. It is equal to the units gram per millilitre (g/mL) and kilogram per litre (kg/L). It is defined by dividing the gram, a unit of mass, by the cubic centimetre, a unit of volume. It is a coherent unit in the CGS system, but is not a coherent unit of the SI.

The density of water is approximately 1 g/cm^{3}, since the gram was originally defined as the mass of one cubic centimetre of water at its maximum density at approximately 4 °C (39 °F).

== Conversions ==
- 1 g/cm^{3} is equal to:
  = 1000 g/L (exactly)
  = 1000 kg/m^{3} (exactly)
  ≈ 62.4280 lb/cu ft (approximately)
  ≈ 133.5265 oz/US gal (approximately)
- 1 kg/m^{3} = 0.001 g/cm^{3}(exactly)
- 1 lb/ft^{3} ≈ 0.01601846 g/cm^{3} (approximately)
- 1 oz/US gal ≈ 0.00748915 g/cm^{3} (approximately)

== See also ==
- Kilogram per cubic metre
