= TRAPPIST-1e =

Earth-size exoplanet orbiting TRAPPIST-1

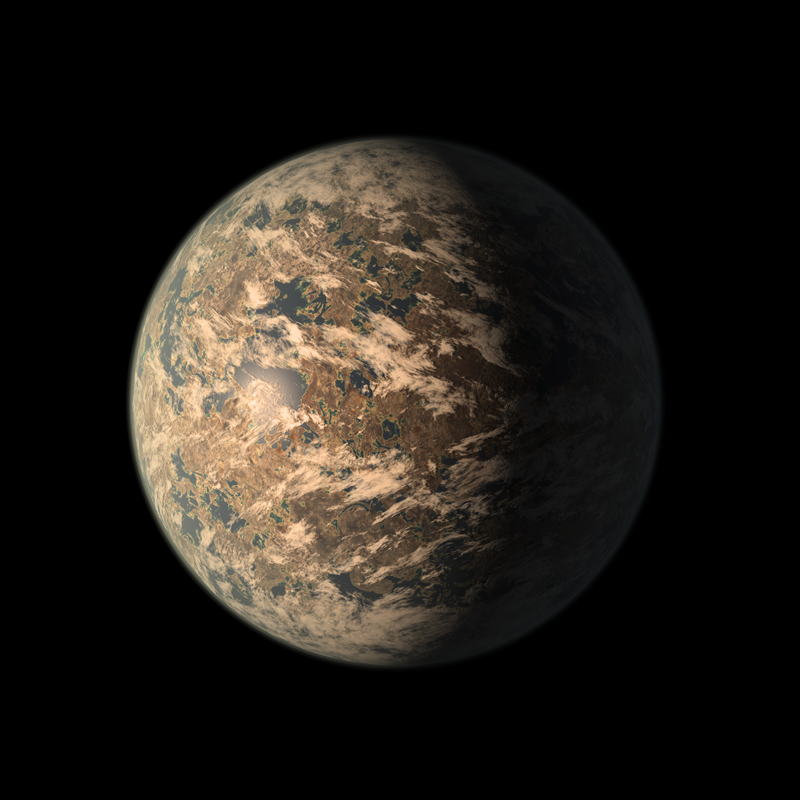
- Artist's impression of TRAPPIST-1e from 2018, depicted here as a tidally locked rocky planet with a liquid ocean. The actual appearance of the exoplanet is currently unknown, but based on its density, it is likely not entirely covered in water.

Discovery
- Discovered by: Michaël Gillon et al.
- Discovery site: Spitzer Space Telescope
- Discovery date: 22 February 2017
- Detection method: Transit

Orbital characteristics
- Semi-major axis: 0.02925±0.00025 AU
- Eccentricity: 0.00510±0.00058
- Orbital period (sidereal): 6.101013±0.000035 d
- Inclination: 89.793°±0.048°
- Argument of periastron: 108.37°±8.47°
- Star: TRAPPIST-1

Physical characteristics
- Mean radius: 0.920+0.013 −0.012 R_{🜨}
- Mass: 0.692±0.022 M_{🜨}
- Mean density: 4.885+0.168 −0.182 g/cm^{3}
- Surface gravity: 0.817±0.024 g 8.01±0.24 m/s^{2}
- Temperature: T_{eq}: 249.7±2.4 K (−23.5 °C; −10.2 °F)

Atmosphere
- Composition by volume: None or mostly N_{2}, with trace amounts of CH_{4} and CO_{2}

TRAPPIST-1e is a tidally locked, rocky, close-to-Earth-sized exoplanet orbiting within the habitable zone around the ultra-cool red dwarf star TRAPPIST-1, located 40.7 light-years (12.5 parsecs; 385 trillion kilometers; 239 trillion miles) away from Earth in the constellation of Aquarius. Astronomers used the transit method to find the exoplanet, a method that measures the dimming of a star when a planet crosses in front of it.

The planet was one of seven planets discovered orbiting the star using observations from the Spitzer Space Telescope. Three of seven planets (e, f, and g) are in the habitable zone. TRAPPIST-1e is similar to Earth's mass, radius, density, gravity, temperature, and stellar flux. It is also confirmed that TRAPPIST-1e lacks a cloud-free hydrogen-dominated atmosphere, meaning that if the planet has an atmosphere it is more likely to have a compact atmosphere like the terrestrial planets in the Solar System.

In November 2018, researchers determined that of the seven exoplanets in the multi-planetary system, TRAPPIST-1e has the best chance of being an Earth-like ocean planet, and the one most worthy of further study regarding habitability. The most recent observation in 2025 was unable to conclude with confidence if there was an atmosphere or not, though it ruled out certain atmosphere scenarios.

== Physical characteristics ==
=== Mass, radius, density, composition, and temperature ===
TRAPPIST-1e was detected with the transit method, where the planet blocked a small percentage of its host star's light when passing between it and Earth. This allowed scientists to accurately determine the planet's radius at 0.920 R_{🜨}, with a small uncertainty of about 83 km (52 mi). Transit-timing variations and advanced computer simulations helped constrain the planet's mass, which turned out to be 0.692 M_{🜨}, or about 15% less massive than Venus. TRAPPIST-1e has 82% the surface gravity of Earth, the third lowest in the system. Its radius and mass are also the third least among the TRAPPIST-1 planets.

With both the radius and mass of TRAPPIST-1e determined with low error margins, scientists could accurately calculate the planet's density, surface gravity, and composition. Initial density estimates in 2018 suggested it has a density of 5.65 g/cm^{3}, about 1.024 times Earth's density of 5.51 g/cm^{3}. TRAPPIST-1e appeared to be unusual in its system, as it was the only planet with a density consistent with a pure rock-iron composition, and the only one with a higher density than Earth (TRAPPIST-1c also appeared to be entirely rock, but with a lower density than TRAPPIST-1e). The higher density of TRAPPIST-1e implies an Earth-like composition and a solid rocky surface. This also appeared to be unusual among the TRAPPIST-1 planets, as most were thought to have densities consistent with being completely covered in either a thick steam/hot CO_{2} atmosphere, a global liquid ocean, or an ice shell. However, refined estimates show that all planets in the system have similar densities, consistent with rocky compositions, with TRAPPIST-1e having a somewhat lower but still Earth-like bulk density.

The planet has a calculated equilibrium temperature of 246.1 K (−27.1 °C; −16.7 °F) given an albedo of 0, also known as its "blackbody" temperature. For a more realistic Earth-like albedo, however, this provides an unrealistic picture of the surface temperature of the planet. Earth's equilibrium temperature is 255 K; it is Earth's greenhouse gases that raise its surface temperatures to the levels we experience. If TRAPPIST-1e has a thick atmosphere, its surface could be much warmer than its equilibrium temperature.

=== Host star ===
The planet orbits an ultracool dwarf star named TRAPPIST-1. The star has a mass of 0.09 M_{☉} and a radius of 0.12 R_{☉}, near the boundary between that of a brown dwarf and low-mass star. It has a temperature of 2,566 K (2,293 °C; 4,159 °F) and is 7.6 billion years old. In comparison, the Sun is 4.6 billion years old and has a temperature of 5,778 K (5,505 °C; 9,941 °F). The star is metal-rich, with a metallicity ([Fe/H]) of 0.04, or 109% the solar amount. This is particularly odd as such low-mass stars near the boundary between brown dwarfs and hydrogen-fusing stars should be expected to have considerably less metal content than the Sun. Its luminosity (L_{☉}) is 0.0566% of that of the Sun.

The star's apparent magnitude, or how bright it appears from Earth's perspective, is 18.8. Therefore, it is far too dim to be seen with the naked eye.

=== Orbit ===
TRAPPIST-1e orbits its host star quite closely. One full revolution around TRAPPIST-1 takes only 6.10 days (~146 hours) to complete. It orbits at a distance of 0.0293 AU (4.38 million km; 2.72 million mi), or just under 3% the separation between Earth and the Sun. For comparison, the closest planet in the Solar System, Mercury, takes 88 days to orbit the Sun at a distance of 0.38 AU (57 million km; 35 million mi). It is in 3:2 resonance with TRAPPIST-1f and 3:2 resonance with TRAPPIST-1d. Despite its close proximity to its host star, TRAPPIST-1e gets only about 60% the starlight that Earth gets from the Sun due to the low luminosity of its star. The star would cover an angular diameter of about 2.17 degrees from the surface of the planet, and so would appear about four times larger than the Sun does from Earth.

=== Atmosphere ===
Transit observations with James Webb Space Telescope suggested no clear answer about the existence of an atmosphere, but it did rule out many atmosphere scenarios. See the "Habitability" studies below.

== Habitability ==
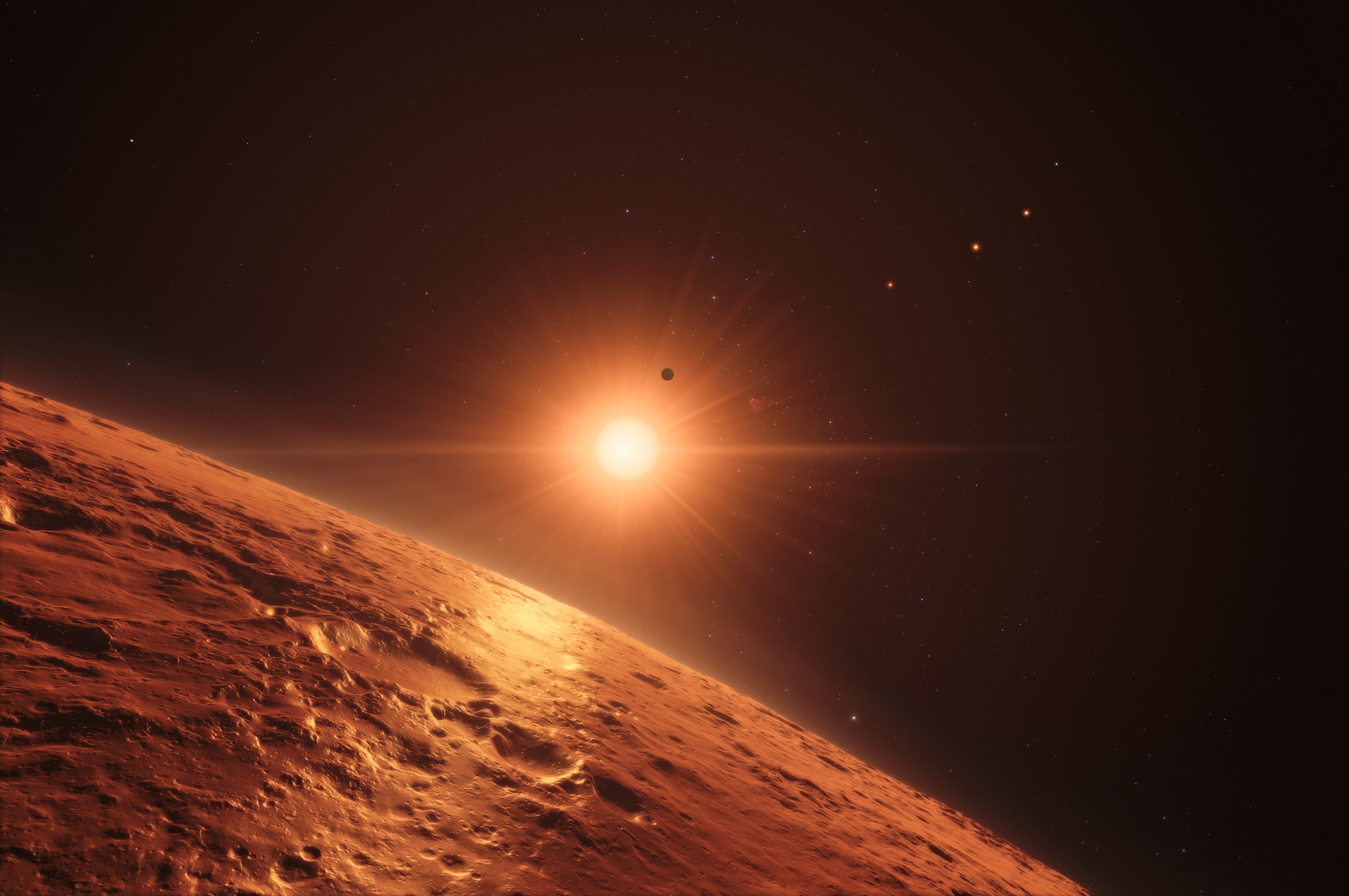
Artist's impression of the TRAPPIST-1 system, seen from above the surface of one of the planets in the habitable zone

The exoplanet was announced to be orbiting within the habitable zone of its parent star, the region where, with the correct conditions and atmospheric properties, liquid water may exist on the surface of the planet. TRAPPIST-1e has a radius of around 0.91 R_{🜨}, so it is likely a rocky planet. Its host star is an ultracool red dwarf, with only about 8% of the mass of the Sun (close to the boundary between brown dwarfs and hydrogen-fusing stars). As a result, stars like TRAPPIST-1 have the potential to remain stable for up to 12 trillion years, which is over 2,000 times longer than the Sun. Because of this ability to live for such a long period of time, it is likely TRAPPIST-1 will be one of the last remaining stars in the Universe, when the gas needed to form new stars will be exhausted, and the existing stars begin to die off.

=== 2018 studies ===
Despite being likely tidally locked meaning one hemisphere permanently faces the star while the other does not which may reduce the habitability of the planet, more detailed studies of TRAPPIST-1e and the other TRAPPIST-1 planets released in 2018 determined that the planet is in fact one of the most Earth-sized worlds found, with 91% the radius, 77% the mass, 102.4% the density (5.65 g/cm^{3}), and 93% the surface gravity. TRAPPIST-1e is confirmed to be a terrestrial planet with a solid, rocky surface. It is cool enough for liquid water to pool on the surface, but not so cold that it would freeze like on TRAPPIST-1f, g, and h.

The planet receives a stellar flux 60.4% that of Earth, about a third lower than that of Earth but significantly more than that of Mars. Its equilibrium temperature ranges from 225 K (−48 °C; −55 °F) to 246.1 K (−27.1 °C; −16.7 °F), depending on how much light the planet reflects into space. Both of these are between those of Earth and Mars as well. In addition, its atmosphere is confirmed to not be dense or thick enough to harm the habitability potential as well, according to models by the University of Washington. The atmosphere, if it is dense enough, may also help to transfer additional heat to the dark side of the planet.

=== 2024 studies ===
According to a 2024 study, based on modeling, TRAPPIST-1e could be having its atmosphere stripped by its host star, possibly as a result of its short orbital period, which would make it inhospitable to life. The same phenomenon could impact the atmospheres of the other planets in this system.

=== 2025 studies ===
Based on four observations of TRAPPIST-1e using the James Webb Space Telescope's NIRSpec instrument, researchers were unable to find conclusive evidence for or against the presence of an atmosphere. The analysis showed two models the data could adequately explain. The first is a flat-line model, which could mean two things: TRAPPIST-1e is a bare rock; or it has an atmosphere of an unknown type completely hidden by a high, thick cloud deck. The second model is a range of nitrogen-rich atmospheres, with nitrogen as the dominant gas. Within the nitrogen scenarios, there is a "tentative preference" for trace amounts of methane (CH_{4}) mixed in. The authors conclude that the primary limitation in studying TRAPPIST-1e is mitigating the effects of its active star. To overcome this, a new program of 15 additional JWST observations is underway. This program will observe back-to-back transits of TRAPPIST-1e and its neighboring planet, TRAPPIST-1b, which is believed to be a bare rock. By using the signal from the bare rock planet to correct for the star's activity, it may be possible to reveal whether TRAPPIST-1e has an atmosphere.

== Discovery ==
A team of astronomers headed by Michaël Gillon used the TRAPPIST (Transiting Planets and Planetesimals Small Telescope) telescope at the La Silla Observatory in the Atacama Desert, Chile, to observe TRAPPIST-1 and search for orbiting planets. By utilising transit photometry, they discovered three Earth-sized planets orbiting the dwarf star; the innermost two are tidally locked to their host star while the outermost appears to lie either within the system's habitable zone or just outside of it. The team made their observations from September–December 2015 and published its findings in the May 2016 issue of the journal Nature.

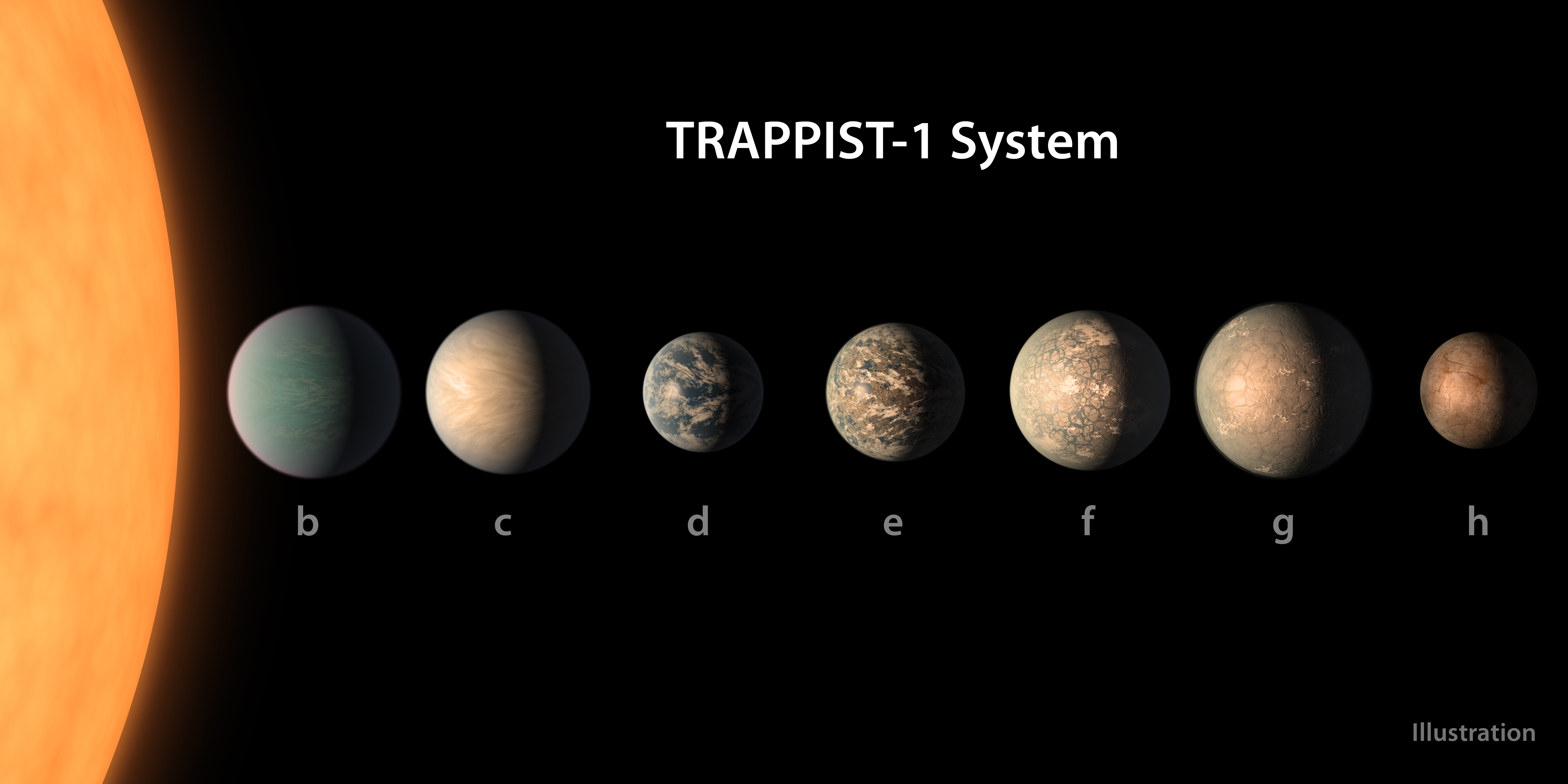
Artist's impression of the TRAPPIST-1 planetary system

The original claim and presumed size of the planet was revised when the full seven-planet system was revealed in 2017:

"We already knew that TRAPPIST-1, a small, faint star some 40 light-years away, was special. In May 2016, a team led by Michaël Gillon at Belgium’s University of Liege announced it was closely orbited by three planets that are probably rocky: TRAPPIST-1b, c and d ...
"As the team kept watching shadow after shadow cross the star, three planets no longer seemed like enough to explain the pattern. "At some point we could not make sense of all these transits," Gillon said.
"Now, after using the space-based Spitzer telescope to stare at the system for almost three weeks straight, Gillon and his team have solved the problem: TRAPPIST-1 has four more planets.
"The planets closest to the star, TRAPPIST-1b and c, are unchanged. But there's a new third planet, which has taken the d moniker, and what had looked like d before turned out to be glimpses of e, f, and g. There's a planet h, too, drifting farthest out, and only spotted once."

== Gallery ==
=== Videos ===
Video (01:32) – Artistic representation of TRAPPIST-1 exoplanets transiting their host star

Video (01:10) – Fly-around animation of the planets of the TRAPPIST-1 system, including TRAPPIST-1e

== See also ==
- List of extrasolar candidates for liquid water
- List of potentially habitable exoplanets
- List of transiting exoplanets
- List of terrestrial exoplanet candidates for atmosphere detection
