= TRAPPIST-1d =

Small rocky exoplanet orbiting TRAPPIST-1

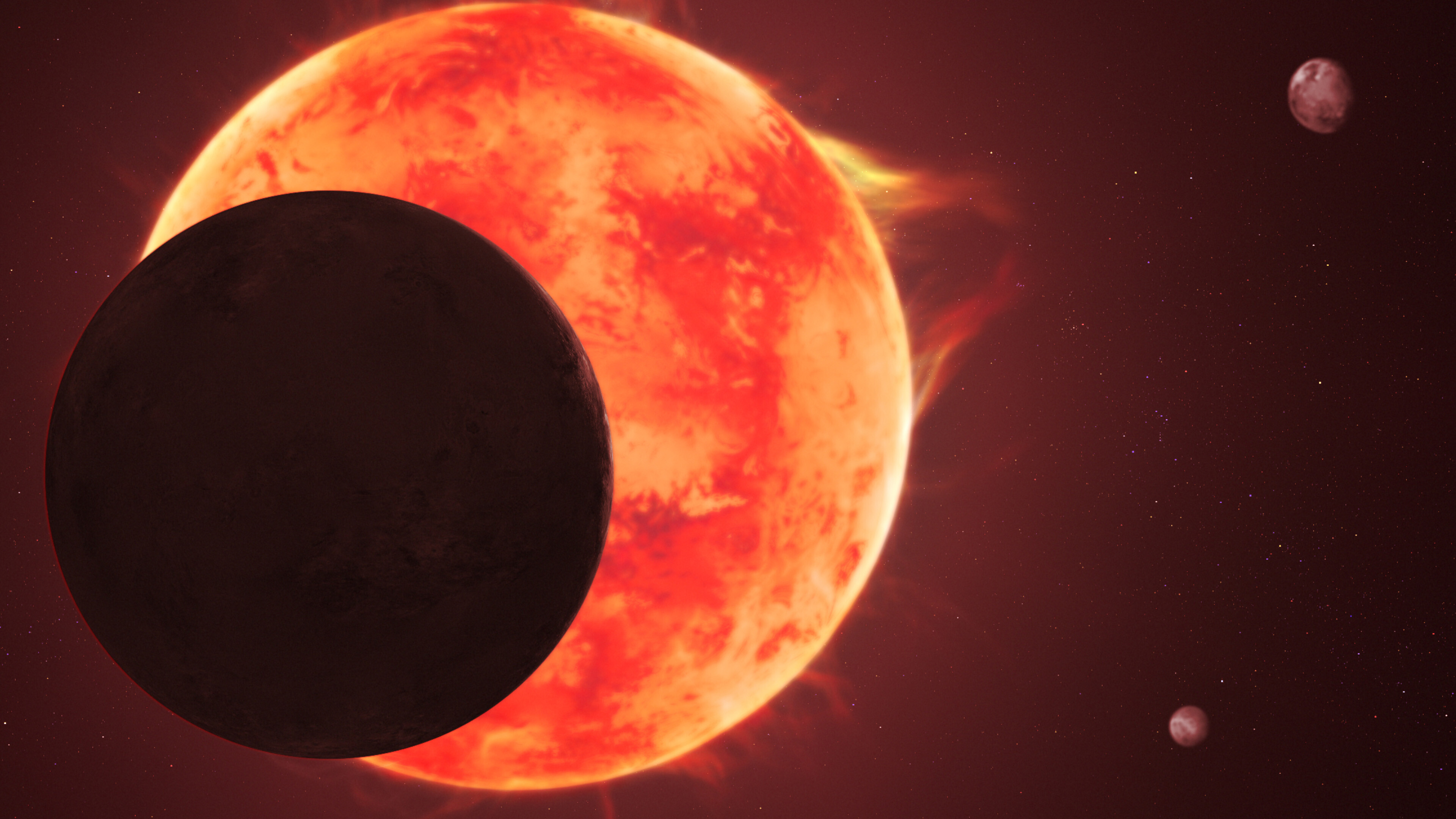
- Artist's impression of TRAPPIST-1d (August 2025)

Discovery
- Discovered by: Michaël Gillon et al.
- Discovery site: TRAPPIST
- Discovery date: 2 May 2016
- Detection method: Transit

Orbital characteristics
- Semi-major axis: 0.02227±0.00019 AU
- Eccentricity: 0.00837±0.00093
- Orbital period (sidereal): 4.049219±0.000026 d
- Inclination: 89.896°±0.077°
- Argument of periastron: −8.73°±6.17°
- Star: TRAPPIST-1

Physical characteristics
- Mean radius: 0.788+0.011 −0.010 R_{🜨}
- Mass: 0.388±0.012 M_{🜨}
- Mean density: 4.354+0.156 −0.163 g/cm^{3}
- Surface gravity: 0.624±0.019 g 6.11±0.19 m/s^{2}
- Temperature: T_{eq}: 286.2±2.8 K (13.1 °C; 55.5 °F)

Atmosphere
- Composition by volume: None, extremely thin, or very cloudy

TRAPPIST-1d is a small exoplanet (about 40 percent the mass of the Earth), which orbits on the inner edge of the habitable zone of the ultra-cool red dwarf star TRAPPIST-1, located 40.7 light-years (12.5 parsecs) away from Earth in the constellation of Aquarius. The exoplanet was found by using the transit method. The first signs of the planet were announced in 2016, but it was not until the following years that more information concerning the probable nature of the planet was obtained. TRAPPIST-1d is the second-least massive planet of the system. It receives just 4.3% more sunlight than Earth, placing it on the inner edge of the habitable zone. A 2025 study, based on a James Webb Space Telescope observation, found that the data was "satisfactorily" consistent with TRAPPIST-1d having no atmosphere at all. Nevertheless, there is still a "marginal possibility" the planet has an atmosphere, but determining this with greater confidence would require a different detection technique.

== Physical characteristics ==
=== Mass, radius, and temperature ===
TRAPPIST-1d was detected with the transit method, allowing scientists to accurately determine its radius. The planet is about 0.788 R_{🜨} with a small error margin of about 70 km. Transit timing variations and complex computer simulations helped accurately determine the mass of the planet, which led to scientists being able to calculate its density, surface gravity and composition. TRAPPIST-1d is a mere 0.388 M_{🜨}, making it one of the least massive exoplanets yet found. Initial estimates suggested that it has 61.6% the density of Earth (3.39 g/cm^{3}) and just under half the gravity. Compared to Mars, it has nearly three times that planet's mass but was thought to still be significantly less dense, which would indicate the presence of a significant atmosphere; models of the low density of TRAPPIST-1d indicated a mainly rocky composition, but with about ≤5% of its mass in the form of a volatile layer. The volatile layer of TRAPPIST-1d may consist of atmosphere, ocean and/or ice layers. However, refined estimates show that the planet is more dense, closer to 79.2% of Earth's bulk density (4.35 g/cm^{3}). TRAPPIST-1d has an equilibrium temperature of 282.1 K (9.0 °C; 48.1 °F), assuming an albedo of 0. For an Earth-like albedo of 0.3, the planet's equilibrium temperature is around 258 K (−15 °C; 5 °F), very similar to Earth's at 255 K (−18 °C; −1 °F).

=== Orbit ===
TRAPPIST-1d is a closely orbiting planet, with one full orbit taking just 4.05 days (97.2 hours) to complete. It orbits at a distance of just 0.0223 AU (3.34 million km; 2.07 million mi) from the host star, or about 2.2% the distance between Earth and the Sun. For comparison, Mercury, the Solar System's innermost planet, takes 88 days to orbit at a distance of about 0.38 AU (57 million km; 35 million mi). It is in 5:3 resonance with TRAPPIST-1c and 3:2 resonance with TRAPPIST-1e. The size of TRAPPIST-1 and the close orbit of TRAPPIST-1d around it means that the star, as seen from the planet, appears 5.5 times as large as the Sun from the Earth. While a planet at TRAPPIST-1d's distance from the Sun would be a scorched world, the low luminosity of TRAPPIST-1 means that the planet gets only 1.043 times the starlight that Earth receives, placing it within the inner part of the conservative habitable zone.

=== Host star ===
The planet orbits an ultracool dwarf star named TRAPPIST-1. The star has a mass of 0.09 M_{☉} (close to the boundary between brown dwarfs and hydrogen-fusing stars) and a radius of 0.12 R_{☉}. It has a temperature of 2,566 K (2,293 °C; 4,159 °F), and is 7.6 billion years old. For comparison, the Sun is 4.6 billion years old and has a temperature of 5,778 K (5,505 °C; 9,941 °F). The star is metal-rich, with a metallicity ([Fe/H]) of 0.04, or 109% the solar amount. This is particularly odd, as such low-mass stars near the boundary between brown dwarfs and hydrogen-fusing stars should be expected to have considerably less metals than the Sun. Finally, its luminosity is 0.05 L_{☉}.

Stars like TRAPPIST-1 have the ability to live up to 4–5 trillion years, 400–500 times longer than the Sun will live (the Sun only has about 5 billion years of lifespan left, slightly more than half of its lifetime). Because of this ability to live for long periods of time, it is likely TRAPPIST-1 will be one of the last remaining stars when the universe is much older than it is now, when the gas needed to form new stars will be exhausted and the remaining ones begin to die off.

The star's apparent magnitude, or how bright it appears from Earth's perspective, is 18.8. Therefore, it is too dim to be seen with the naked eye (the limit for that is 6.5).

The star is not just very small and far away, it also emits comparatively little visible light, mainly shining in the invisible infrared. Even from the close-in proximity of TRAPPIST-1d (about 50 times closer than Earth is from the Sun), the planet receives less than 1% the visible light Earth sees from the Sun. This would probably make the days on TRAPPIST-1d never brighter than twilight is on Earth. However, that still means that TRAPPIST-1 could easily shine at least 3000 times brighter in the sky of TRAPPIST-1d than the full moon does in Earth's night sky.

== Atmosphere ==
In 2025, the planet was observed by the James Webb Space Telescope. Study results determined with greater than 95% confidence that thick and cloud-free atmospheres could be ruled out (analogous to a clear Venus, early Mars, Titan and Archean Earth). This leaves two main possibilities consistent with the data: either the planet has no atmosphere, similar to Mercury or the Moon, which was termed the "satisfactory fit" for the data by the study's authors, or there is a "marginal possibility" that TRAPPIST-1d has an atmosphere with high-altitude clouds or aerosols that block starlight from passing through, thus muting any molecular signatures from detection. In the latter scenario, there could be "an extremely thin Mars-like CO_{2} atmosphere, a Venus-like [greenhouse] scenario with high-altitude clouds, or the CO_{2} signature of a modern Earth composition when accounting for Earth's water clouds." This scenario lies at the very edge of the 2-sigma boundary of statistical significance and as such it cannot be confidently ruled out; however, it is also not a good fit for the data. Lead scientist Piaulet-Ghorayeb said the detection method they used, transmission spectroscopy, is only one of multiple approaches, and while the study result "doesn't kill our prospects" for finding some kind of atmosphere, it will be "a bit harder" after these results.

Because TRAPPIST-1d is only ~30% the Earth's mass, it, like Venus and Mars, may have no magnetic field, which would allow the parent star's solar wind to strip away the more volatile components of its atmosphere (including water), leaving it hydrogen-poor like those planets.

== Discovery ==
A team of astronomers headed by Michaël Gillon of the Institut d'Astrophysique et Géophysique at the University of Liège in Belgium used the TRAPPIST (Transiting Planets and Planetesimals Small Telescope) telescope at the La Silla Observatory in the Atacama Desert, Chile, to observe TRAPPIST-1 and search for orbiting planets. By utilising transit photometry, they discovered three Earth-sized planets orbiting the dwarf star; the innermost two are tidally locked to their host star while the outermost appears to lie either within the system's habitable zone or just outside of it. The team made their observations from September to December 2015 and published its findings in the May 2016 issue of the journal Nature.

The original claim and presumed size of the planet was revised when the full seven-planet system was revealed in 2017:

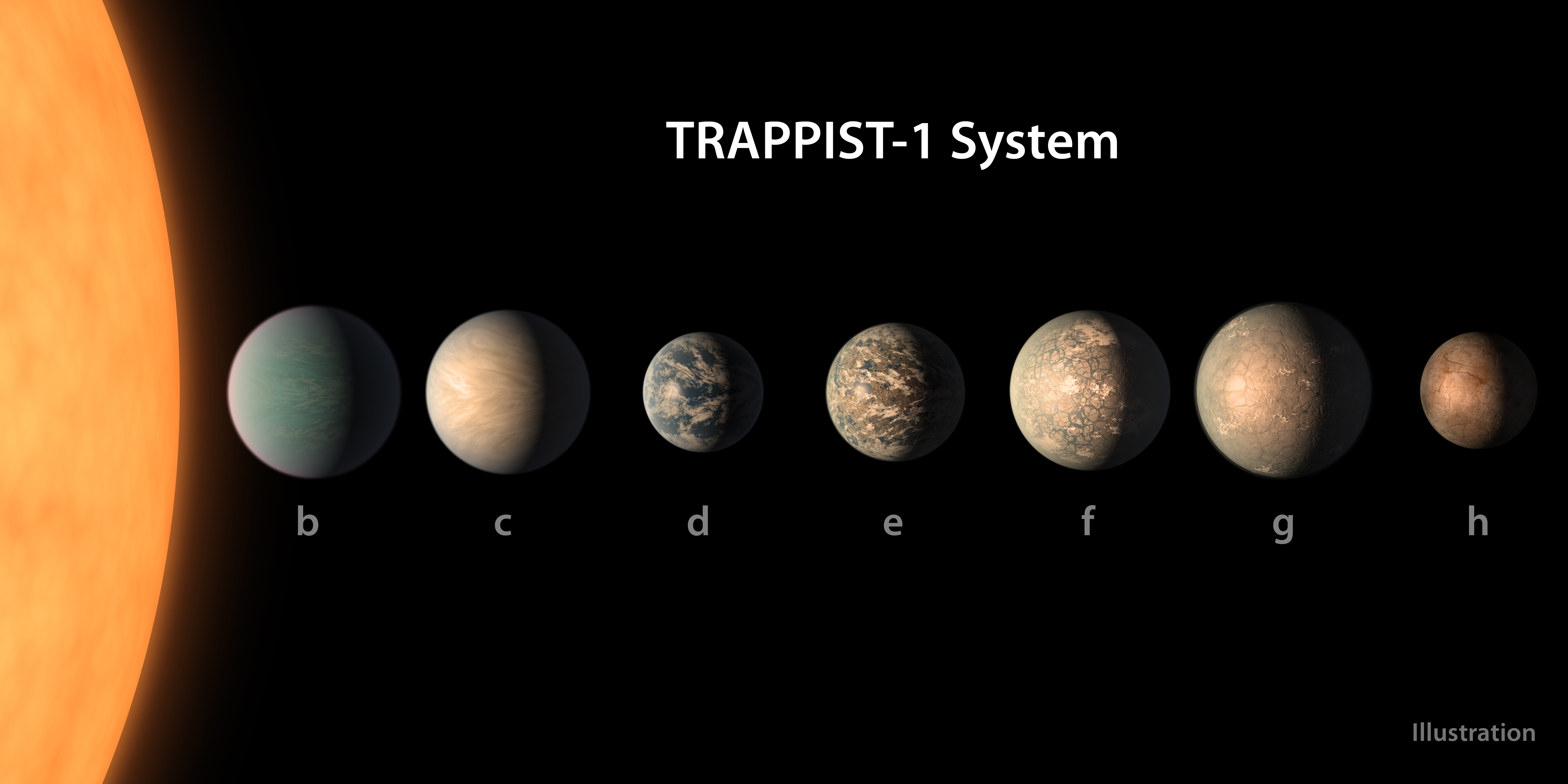
Artist's impression of the TRAPPIST-1 planetary system.

"We already knew that TRAPPIST-1, a small, faint star some 40 light-years away, was special. In May 2016, a team led by Michaël Gillon at Belgium's University of Liege announced it was closely orbited by three planets that are probably rocky: TRAPPIST-1b, c and d...

"As the team kept watching shadow after shadow cross the star, three planets no longer seemed like enough to explain the pattern. "At some point we could not make sense of all these transits," Gillon says.

"Now, after using the space-based Spitzer telescope to stare at the system for almost three weeks straight, Gillon and his team have solved the problem: TRAPPIST-1 has four more planets.

"The planets closest to the star, TRAPPIST-1b and c, are unchanged. But there's a new third planet, which has taken the d moniker, and what had looked like d before turned out to be glimpses of e, f and g. There's a planet h, too, drifting farthest away and only spotted once."

== See also ==
- List of potentially habitable exoplanets
- List of terrestrial exoplanet candidates for atmosphere detection
