= TRAPPIST-1f =

Earth-size exoplanet orbiting TRAPPIST-1

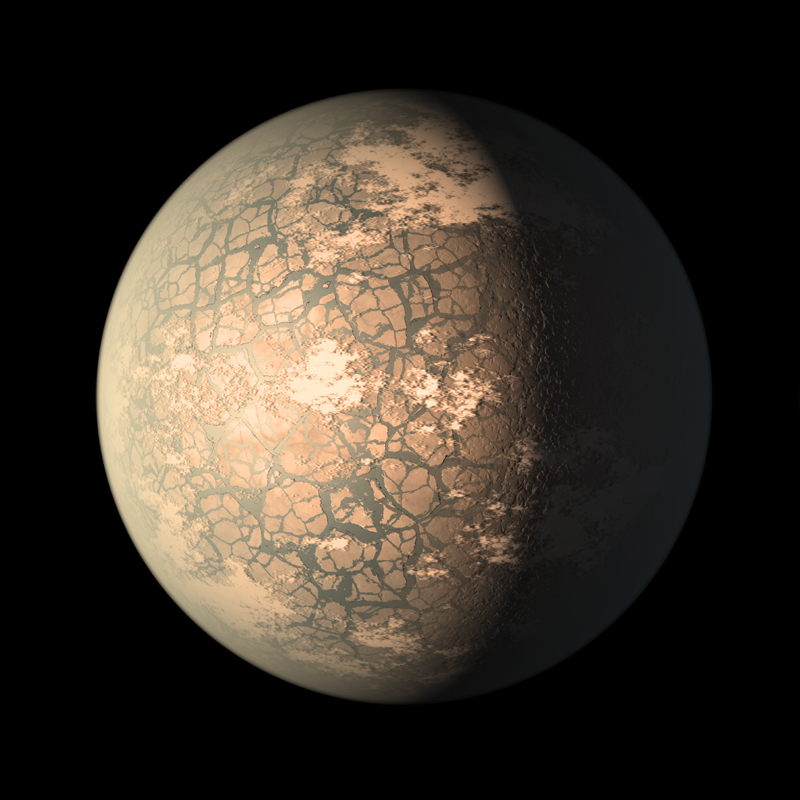
- Artist's impression of TRAPPIST-1f. (February 2018)

Discovery
- Discovered by: Michaël Gillon et al.
- Discovery site: Spitzer Space Telescope
- Discovery date: 22 February 2017
- Detection method: Transit

Orbital characteristics
- Semi-major axis: 0.03849±0.00033 AU
- Eccentricity: 0.01007±0.00068
- Orbital period (sidereal): 9.207540±0.000032 d
- Inclination: 89.740°±0.019°
- Argument of periastron: 368.81°±3.11°
- Star: TRAPPIST-1

Physical characteristics
- Mean radius: 1.045+0.013 −0.012 R_{🜨}
- Mass: 1.039±0.031 M_{🜨}
- Mean density: 5.009+0.138 −0.158 g/cm^{3}
- Surface gravity: 0.951±0.024 g 9.32±0.24 m/s^{2}
- Temperature: T_{eq}: 217.7±2.1 K (−55.5 °C; −67.8 °F)

TRAPPIST-1f is an exoplanet, likely rocky, orbiting within the habitable zone around the ultra-cool red dwarf star TRAPPIST-1, located 40.7 light-years (12.5 parsecs) away from Earth in the constellation of Aquarius. The exoplanet was found by using the transit method, in which the dimming effect that a planet causes as it crosses in front of its star is measured.

The planet was one of seven planets to be discovered orbiting the star in 2017 using observations from the Spitzer Space Telescope.

The planet is likely tidally locked, and has been as an eyeball planet candidate.

== Physical characteristics ==
=== Mass, radius, and temperature ===
TRAPPIST-1f is an Earth-sized exoplanet, meaning it has a radius and mass close to that of Earth. It has an equilibrium temperature of 218 K (−55 °C; −67 °F). It has a radius of 1.045 R_{🜨} and a mass of 1.039 M_{🜨}. It was initially estimated to have a much lower mass, and thus a low density of 3.3±0.9 g/cm^{3} and a surface gravity around 6.1 m/s^{2} (62% of Earth's value). This suggested a large amount of volatiles, with a 2017 study suggesting that a water ocean may comprise as much as 20% of the planet's mass, increasing the temperature at the bottom of such an ocean to above 1,400 K (1,130 °C; 2,060 °F). However, refined density estimates show that TRAPPIST-1f, like other planets in the system, is only slightly less dense than Earth, consistent with a rocky composition.

=== Atmosphere ===
According to simulations of magma ocean-atmosphere interaction, TRAPPIST-1f is likely to retain a fraction of primordial steam atmosphere during the initial stages of evolution, and therefore today is likely to possess a thick ocean covered by atmosphere rich in abiotic oxygen. Helium emission from TRAPPIST-1f (and planets b and e) has not been detected as of 2022.

=== Host star ===
The planet orbits an ultracool dwarf star named TRAPPIST-1. The star has a mass of 0.09 M_{☉} and a radius of 0.12 R_{☉}. It has a temperature of 2,566 K (2,293 °C; 4,159 °F) and is at least 7.6 billion years old. In comparison, the Sun is 4.6 billion years old and has a temperature of 5,778 K. The star is metal-rich, with a metallicity ([Fe/H]) of 0.04, or 109% the solar amount. This is particularly odd as such low-mass stars near the boundary between brown dwarfs and hydrogen-fusing stars should be expected to have considerably less metal content than the Sun; on the other hand, metal-rich stars are also more likely to have planets than metal-poor ones. Its luminosity (L_{☉}) is 0.05% of that of the Sun.

The star's apparent magnitude, or how bright it appears from Earth's perspective, is 18.8. Therefore, it is too dim to be seen with the naked eye.

=== Orbit ===
TRAPPIST-1f orbits its host star with an orbital period of about 9.21 days and an orbital distance of about 0.0385 AU (5.76 million km; 3.58 million mi) compared to the distance of Mercury from the Sun, which is about 0.38 AU. It is in 4:3 resonance with TRAPPIST-1g and 3:2 resonance with TRAPPIST-1e.

== Habitability ==
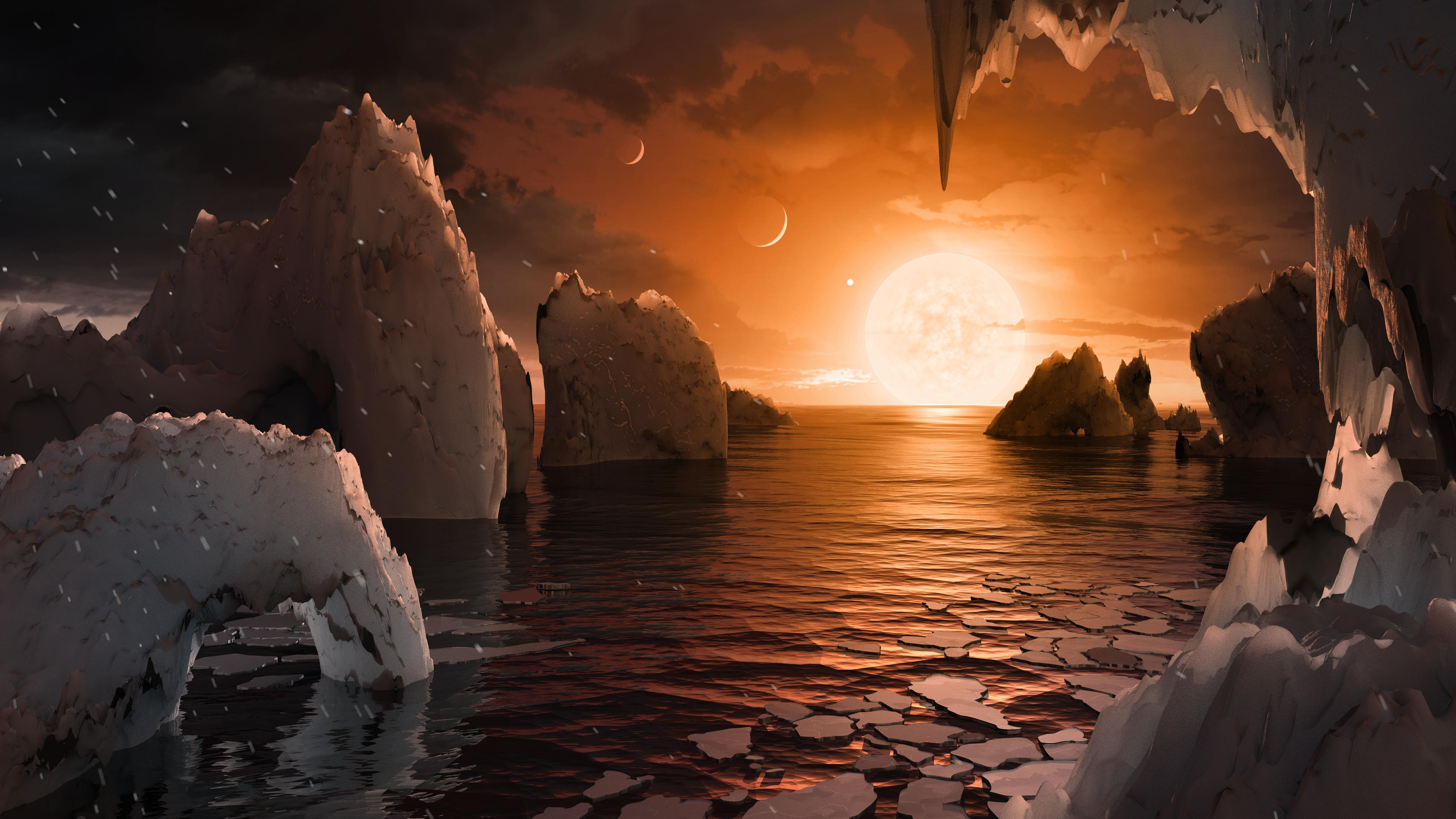
Artist's impression of the surface of TRAPPIST-1f, depicting a liquid water ocean on its surface. The parent star and neighbouring planets are also illustrated.

The exoplanet was announced to be either orbiting within or slightly outside of the habitable zone of its parent star, the region where, with the correct conditions and atmospheric properties, liquid water may exist on the surface of the planet. On 31 August 2017, astronomers at the Hubble Space Telescope reported the first evidence of possible water content on the TRAPPIST-1 exoplanets.

TRAPPIST-1f has a radius about the same as Earth, at around 1.045 R_{🜨}, but was initially thought to have only about two thirds of Earth's mass, at around 0.68 M_{🜨}. So, it was considered somewhat unlikely to be a fully rocky planet, and extremely unlikely to be an Earth-like one, that is rocky with a large iron core but without a thick hydrogen-helium atmosphere enveloping the planet. Simulations in 2017 suggested the planet is approximately 20% water by composition, much higher than that of Earth. With such a massive water envelope, the pressure and temperature will be high enough to keep the water in a gaseous state and any liquid water will only exist as clouds near the top of TRAPPIST-1f's atmosphere. Based on this study, TRAPPIST-1f is therefore likely to be no more habitable than any other ice giant with water clouds in its atmosphere. However, refined estimates show that TRAPPIST-1f has about the same mass as Earth, and like other planets in the system, is only slightly less dense than Earth, consistent with a rocky composition.

Its host star is an ultracool red dwarf, with only about 8% of the mass of the Sun (close to the boundary between brown dwarfs and hydrogen-fusing stars). As a result, stars like TRAPPIST-1 have the ability to live up to 4–5 trillion years, 400–500 times longer than the Sun will live. Because of this ability to live for long periods of time, it is likely TRAPPIST-1 will be one of the last remaining stars when the Universe is much older than it is now, when the gas needed to form new stars will be exhausted, and the remaining ones begin to die off.

The planet is very likely tidally locked, with one hemisphere permanently facing towards the star, while the opposite side shrouded in eternal darkness. However, between these two intense areas, there would be a sliver of moderate temperature – called the terminator line, where the temperatures may be suitable (about 273 K or 0 °C or 32 °F) for liquid water to exist. Additionally, a much larger portion of the planet may be habitable if it supports a thick enough atmosphere to transfer heat to the side facing away from the star.

== See also ==
- List of extrasolar candidates for liquid water
- List of potentially habitable exoplanets
- List of transiting exoplanets
