= TRAPPIST-1g =

Earth-size exoplanet orbiting TRAPPIST-1

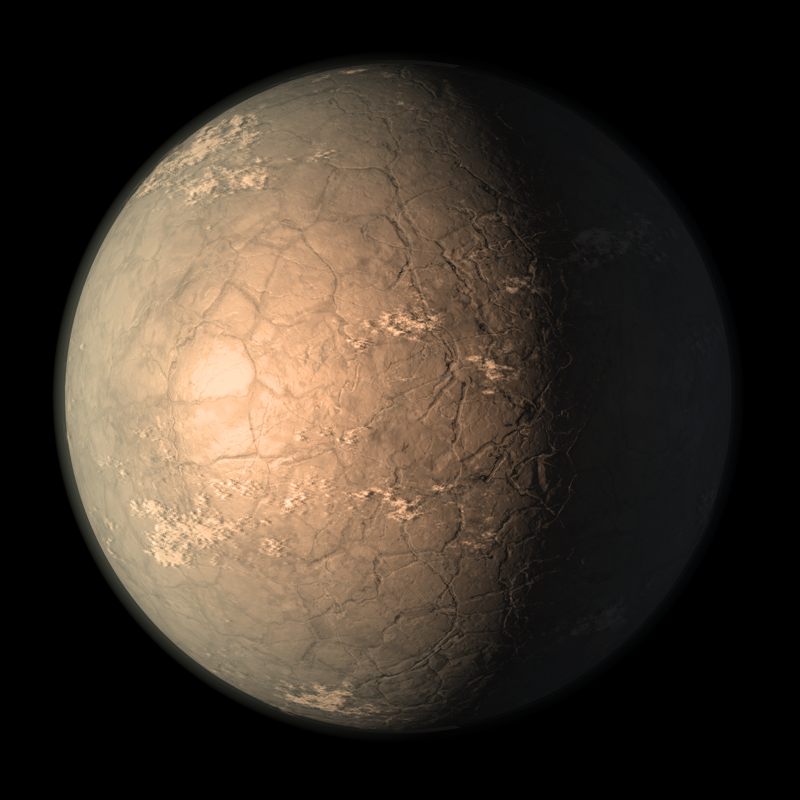
- Artist's impression of TRAPPIST-1g. (February 2018)

Discovery
- Discovered by: Michaël Gillon et al.
- Discovery site: Spitzer Space Telescope
- Discovery date: 22 February 2017
- Detection method: Transit

Orbital characteristics
- Semi-major axis: 0.04683±0.00040 AU
- Eccentricity: 0.00208±0.00058
- Orbital period (sidereal): 12.352446±0.000054 d
- Inclination: 89.742°±0.012°
- Argument of periastron: 191.34°±13.83°
- Star: TRAPPIST-1

Physical characteristics
- Mean radius: 1.129+0.015 −0.013 R_{🜨}
- Mass: 1.321±0.038 M_{🜨}
- Mean density: 5.042+0.136 −0.158 g/cm^{3}
- Surface gravity: 1.035±0.026 g 10.15±0.25 m/s^{2}
- Temperature: T_{eq}: 197.3±1.9 K (−75.8 °C; −104.5 °F)

TRAPPIST-1g is an exoplanet orbiting around the ultra-cool red dwarf star TRAPPIST-1, located 40.7 light-years (12.5 parsecs) away from Earth in the constellation Aquarius. The planet was one of seven planets to be discovered orbiting the star in 2017 using observations from the Spitzer Space Telescope. The exoplanet is within the optimistic habitable zone of its host star. It was found by using the transit method, in which the dimming effect that a planet causes as it crosses in front of its star is measured.

The second-most-distant-known planet in its system, TRAPPIST-1g is a planet somewhat larger than Earth and with a similar density, meaning it is likely a rocky planet.

== Physical characteristics ==
=== Mass, radius, and temperature ===
TRAPPIST-1g has a radius of 1.129 R_{🜨} and a mass of 1.321 M_{🜨}, with a density only slightly less than Earth's, though initial estimates suggested its density was only 4.186 g/cm^{3}, about 76% of Earth's. Based on mass-radius calculations and its distant location relative to its host star (0.047 AU) and the fact that the planet only receives 25.2% of the stellar flux that Earth does, the planet is likely covered by a thick ice envelope if an atmosphere does not exist.

=== Atmosphere ===
TRAPPIST-1g could have a global water ocean or an exceptionally thick steam atmosphere. According to a simulation of magma ocean-atmosphere interaction, TRAPPIST-1g is likely to retain a large fraction of primordial steam atmosphere during the initial stages of evolution, and therefore today is likely to possess a thick ocean covered by atmosphere containing hundreds of bars of abiotic oxygen.

On 31 August 2017, astronomers at the Hubble Space Telescope reported the first evidence of possible water content on the TRAPPIST-1 exoplanets.

=== Host star ===
The planet orbits an ultracool dwarf star named TRAPPIST-1. The star has a mass of 0.09 M_{☉} and a radius of 0.12 R_{☉}. It has a temperature of 2,566 K (2,293 °C; 4,159 °F). The age of the star is about 7.6±2.2 billion years old. In comparison, the Sun is 4.6 billion years old and has a temperature of 5,778 K. The star is metal-rich, with a metallicity ([Fe/H]) of 0.04, or 109% the solar amount. This is particularly odd as such low-mass stars near the boundary between brown dwarfs and hydrogen-fusing stars should be expected to have considerably less metal content than the Sun. Its luminosity (L_{☉}) is 0.05% of that of the Sun.

The star's apparent magnitude, or how bright it appears from Earth's perspective, is 18.8, too dim to be seen with the naked eye.

=== Orbit ===
TRAPPIST-1g orbits its host star with an orbital period of about 12.35 days and an orbital distance of about 0.0469 AU (7.02 million km; 4.36 million mi) compared to the distance of Mercury from the Sun, which is about 0.38 AU. This is in the outer limit of TRAPPIST-1's theoretical habitable zone. The orbit of TRAPPIST-1g has an eccentricity of 0.00208, much lower than that of Earth and the lowest in its system. Its orbit varies by only about 41,000 kilometers (compared to about 5 million km for Earth), meaning the planet's climate is likely very stable. It is in 3:2 resonance with TRAPPIST-1h and 4:3 resonance with TRAPPIST-1f.

== See also ==
- List of extrasolar candidates for liquid water
- List of transiting exoplanets
- List of potentially habitable exoplanets
- List of nearest terrestrial exoplanet candidates
