= TRAPPIST-1 =

Red dwarf star in the constellation Aquarius

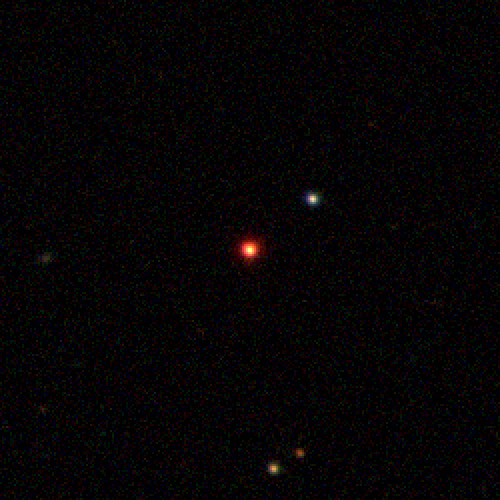
- Colour photograph of TRAPPIST-1 in visible light, taken in 2009.

Observation data Epoch J2000 Equinox ICRS
- Constellation: Aquarius
- Right ascension: 23^{h} 06^{m} 29.368^{s}
- Declination: −05° 02′ 29.04″
- Apparent magnitude (V): 18.798±0.082

Characteristics
- Evolutionary stage: Main sequence
- Spectral type: M8V
- Apparent magnitude (R): 16.466±0.065
- Apparent magnitude (I): 14.024±0.115
- Apparent magnitude (J): 11.354±0.022
- Apparent magnitude (H): 10.718±0.021
- Apparent magnitude (K): 10.296±0.023
- V−R color index: 2.332
- R−I color index: 2.442
- J−H color index: 0.636
- J−K color index: 1.058

Astrometry
| Radial velocity (R_{v}) | −52.97±0.04 km/s |
| Proper motion (μ) | RA: 930.788 mas/yr Dec.: −479.038 mas/yr |
| Parallax (π) | 80.2123±0.0716 mas |
| Distance | 40.66 ± 0.04 ly (12.47 ± 0.01 pc) |

Details
| Mass | 0.0898±0.0023 M_{☉} |
| Radius | 0.1191±0.0011 R_{☉} |
| Luminosity (bolometric) | (5.66±0.22)×10^{−4} L_{☉} |
| Surface gravity (log g) | 5.14+0.09 −0.08 cgs |
| Temperature | 2,325±13 K |
| Metallicity | $\begin{smallmatrix}\left[\ce{M}/\ce{H}\right]\end{smallmatrix}$ = +0.00±0.06 |
| Metallicity [Fe/H] | +0.04±0.08 dex |
| Rotation | 3.3015±0.0050 d |
| Rotational velocity (v sin i) | 2.15±0.19 km/s |
| Age | 7.6±2.2 Gyr |

Other designations
- 2MUCD 12171, 2MASS J23062928–0502285, EPIC 246199087, K2-112, SPECULOOS-1, (Note: An internal name of the star used by the SPECULOOS project, as this planetary system was its first discovery.) TRAPPIST-1a

Database references
| SIMBAD | data |
| Exoplanet Archive | data |

TRAPPIST-1 (also known as 2MASS J23062928−0502285 or SPECULOOS-1) is a red dwarf star (Note: A red dwarf is a very small and cold star. They are the most common type of star in the Milky Way.) with seven known exoplanets. It lies in the constellation Aquarius approximately 40.66 light-years (12.47 pc) away from Earth. An ultra-cool dwarf, it has a surface temperature of about 2,566 K (2,290 °C; 4,160 °F). Its radius is slightly larger than Jupiter's and it has a mass of about 9% of the Sun. It is estimated to be 7.6 billion years old, making it older than the Solar System. The discovery of the star was first published in 2000.

Observations in 2016 from TRAPPIST–South (Transiting Planets and Planetesimals Small Telescope project) at La Silla Observatory in Chile and other telescopes led to the discovery of two terrestrial planets in orbit around TRAPPIST-1. In 2017, further analysis of the original observations identified five more terrestrial planets. The seven planets take between 1.5 and 19 days to orbit the star in circular orbits. They are all likely tidally locked to TRAPPIST-1, and it is therefore believed that each planet is in permanent day on one side and permanent night on the other. Their masses are comparable to that of Earth and they all lie in the same plane; seen from Earth, they pass in front of the star. This placement allowed the planets to be detected: when they pass in front of the star, its apparent magnitude dims.

Up to four of the planets—designated d, e, f, and g—orbit at distances where temperatures are likely suitable for the existence of liquid water, and are thus potentially hospitable to life. There is no evidence of an atmosphere on any of the planets, and observations of TRAPPIST-1b have in particular ruled out the existence of an atmosphere. It is unclear whether radiation emissions from TRAPPIST-1 would allow for such atmospheres. The planets have low densities; they may consist of large amounts of volatile material. Due to the possibility of several of the planets being habitable, the system has drawn interest from researchers and has appeared in popular culture.

== Discovery ==
The star known as TRAPPIST-1 was discovered in 1999 by astronomer John Gizis and colleagues during a survey of close-by ultra-cool dwarf stars. It appeared in sample C of the surveyed stars, which was obtained in June 1999. Publication of the discovery took place in 2000. TRAPPIST-1 is named after TRAPPIST (the Transiting Planets and Planetesimals Small Telescope project), (Note: TRAPPIST is a 60-centimetre (24 in) telescope intended to be a prototype for the "Search for habitable Planets EClipsing ULtra-cOOl Stars" project (SPECULOOS), which aims to identify planets around close, cold stars. TRAPPIST is used to find exoplanets, and is preferentially employed on stars colder than 3,000 K (2,730 °C; 4,940 °F).) which discovered the first two exoplanets around the star.

Its planetary system was discovered by a team led by Michaël Gillon, a Belgian astronomer at the University of Liege, in 2016 during observations made at the La Silla Observatory, Chile, using the TRAPPIST telescope. The discovery was based on anomalies in the light curves (Note: When a planet moves in front of its star, it absorbs part of the star's radiation, which may be observed via telescopes.) measured by the telescope in 2015. These were initially interpreted as indicating the existence of three planets. In 2016, separate discoveries revealed that the third planet was in fact multiple planets. The telescopes and observatories involved were the Spitzer Space Telescope and the ground-based TRAPPIST–South, TRAPPIST–North in Oukaïmeden Observatory, Morocco, the South African Astronomical Observatory, and the Liverpool Telescopes and William Herschel Telescopes in Spain.

The observations of TRAPPIST-1 are considered among the most important research findings of the Spitzer Space Telescope. Complementing the findings were observations by the Himalayan Chandra Telescope, the United Kingdom Infrared Telescope and the Very Large Telescope. Since then, research has confirmed the existence of at least seven planets in the system, the orbits of which have been calculated using measurements from the Spitzer and Kepler telescopes. Some news reports incorrectly attributed the discovery of the TRAPPIST-1 planets to NASA alone; in fact the TRAPPIST project that led to their discovery received funding from both NASA and the European Research Council of the European Union (EU).

== Description ==
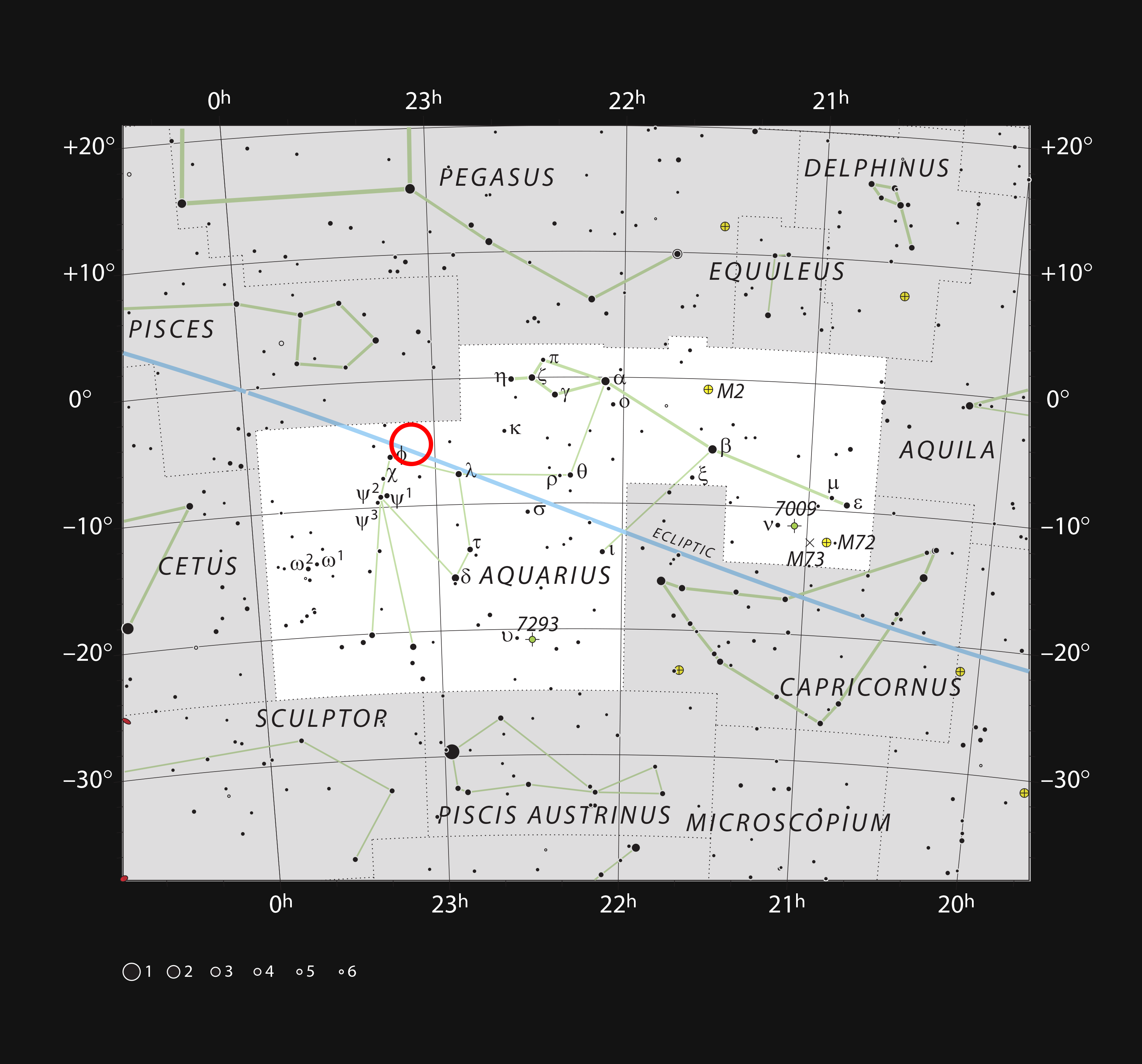
TRAPPIST-1 is within the red circle in the constellation Aquarius

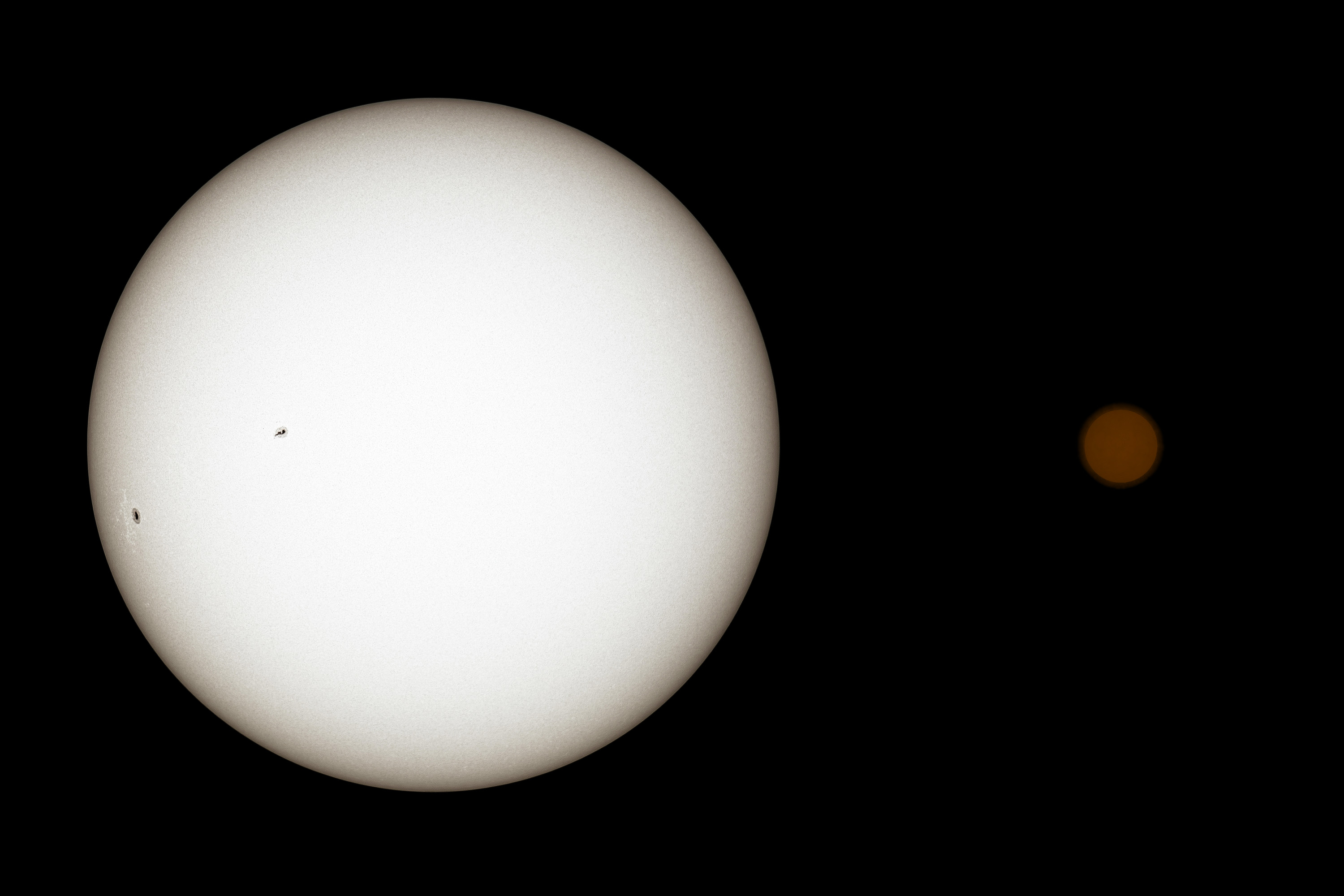
True-colour illustration of the Sun (left) next to TRAPPIST-1 (right). TRAPPIST-1 is darker, redder and smaller than the Sun.

TRAPPIST-1 is in the constellation Aquarius, five degrees south of the celestial equator. (Note: The celestial equator is the equator's projection into the sky.) It is a relatively close star located 40.66±0.04 light-years from Earth, (Note: Based on parallax measurements; the parallax is the position of a celestial object with respect to other celestial objects for a given position of Earth. It can be used to infer the distance of the object from Earth.) with a large proper motion (Note: The movement of the star in the sky, relative to background stars.) and no companion stars.

It is a red dwarf of spectral class M8.0±0.5, (Note: Spectral types are used to categorise stars by their temperature; red dwarfs include the spectral type M and K.) meaning it is relatively small and cold. With a radius 12% of that of the Sun, TRAPPIST-1 is only slightly larger than the planet Jupiter (though much more massive). Its mass is approximately 9% of that of the Sun, being just sufficient to allow nuclear fusion to take place. TRAPPIST-1's density is unusually low for a red dwarf. It has a low effective temperature (Note: The effective temperature is the temperature a black body that emits the same amount of radiation would have.) of 2,566 K (2,293 °C) making it, as of 2022, the coldest-known star to host planets. TRAPPIST-1 is cold enough for condensates to form in its photosphere; (Note: The photosphere is a thin layer at the surface of a star, where most of its light is produced.) these have been detected through the polarisation they induce in its radiation during transits of its planets. Elements heavier than helium form compounds in its atmosphere, which display as absorption lines in TRAPPIST-1's spectrum.

There is no evidence that it has a stellar cycle. (Note: The solar cycle is the Sun's 11-year long period, during which solar output varies by about 0.1%.) Its luminosity, emitted mostly as infrared radiation, is about 0.055% that of the Sun. Low-precision measurements from the XMM-Newton satellite and other facilities show that the star emits faint radiation at short wavelengths such as X-rays and UV radiation. (Note: Including Lyman-alpha radiation) There are no detectable radio wave emissions.

=== Rotation period and age ===
Measurements of TRAPPIST-1's rotation have yielded a period of 3.3 days; earlier measurements of 1.4 days appear to have been caused by changes in the distribution of its starspots. Its rotational axis may be slightly offset from that of its planets.

Using a combination of techniques including composition and movements of the star, the age of TRAPPIST-1 has been estimated at about 7.6±2.2 billion years, making it older than the Solar System, which is about 4.5 billion years old. It is expected to shine for ten trillion years—about 700 times longer than the present age of the universe—whereas the Sun will run out of hydrogen and leave the main sequence (Note: The main sequence is the longest stage of a star's lifespan, when it is fusing hydrogen.) in a few billion years.

=== Activity ===
Photospheric features have been detected on TRAPPIST-1 and probably make up a substantial part of the stellar surface. James Webb Space Telescope (JWST) observations indicate that cold starspots might cover up to one quarter of its photosphere. The Kepler and Spitzer Space Telescopes have observed possible bright spots, which may be faculae, (Note: Faculae are bright spots on the photosphere.) although some of these may be too large to qualify as such. Bright spots are correlated to the occurrence of some stellar flares. (Note: Flares are presumably magnetic phenomena lasting for minutes or hours during which parts of the star emit more radiation than usual. In the case of TRAPPIST-1, flares reach temperatures of no more than 9,000 K (8,730 °C; 15,740 °F)) and their energy distribution resembles that of solar flares. Kepler K2 observations have shown that TRAPPIST-1 produces frequent flares (42 flares in 80 days), including large, complex flares that could alter nearby planetary atmospheres irreversibly and significantly, raising doubts of hosting life as we know it on Earth.

The star has a strong magnetic field with a mean intensity of about 600 gauss (Note: For comparison, a strong fridge magnet has a strength of about 100 gauss and Earth's magnetic field about 0.5 gauss.) which may be an underestimate. The magnetic field drives high chromospheric (Note: The chromosphere is an outer layer of a star.) activity, and may be capable of trapping coronal mass ejections. (Note: A coronal mass ejection is an eruption of coronal material to the outside of a star.)

According to Garraffo et al. (2017), TRAPPIST-1 loses about 3×10^{−14} solar masses per year to the stellar wind, a rate which is about 1.5 times that of the Sun. Dong et al. (2018) simulated the observed properties of TRAPPIST-1 with a mass loss of 4.1×10^{−15} solar masses per year. Simulations to estimate mass loss are complicated because, as of 2019, most of the parameters that govern TRAPPIST-1's stellar wind are not known from direct observation.

== Planetary system ==
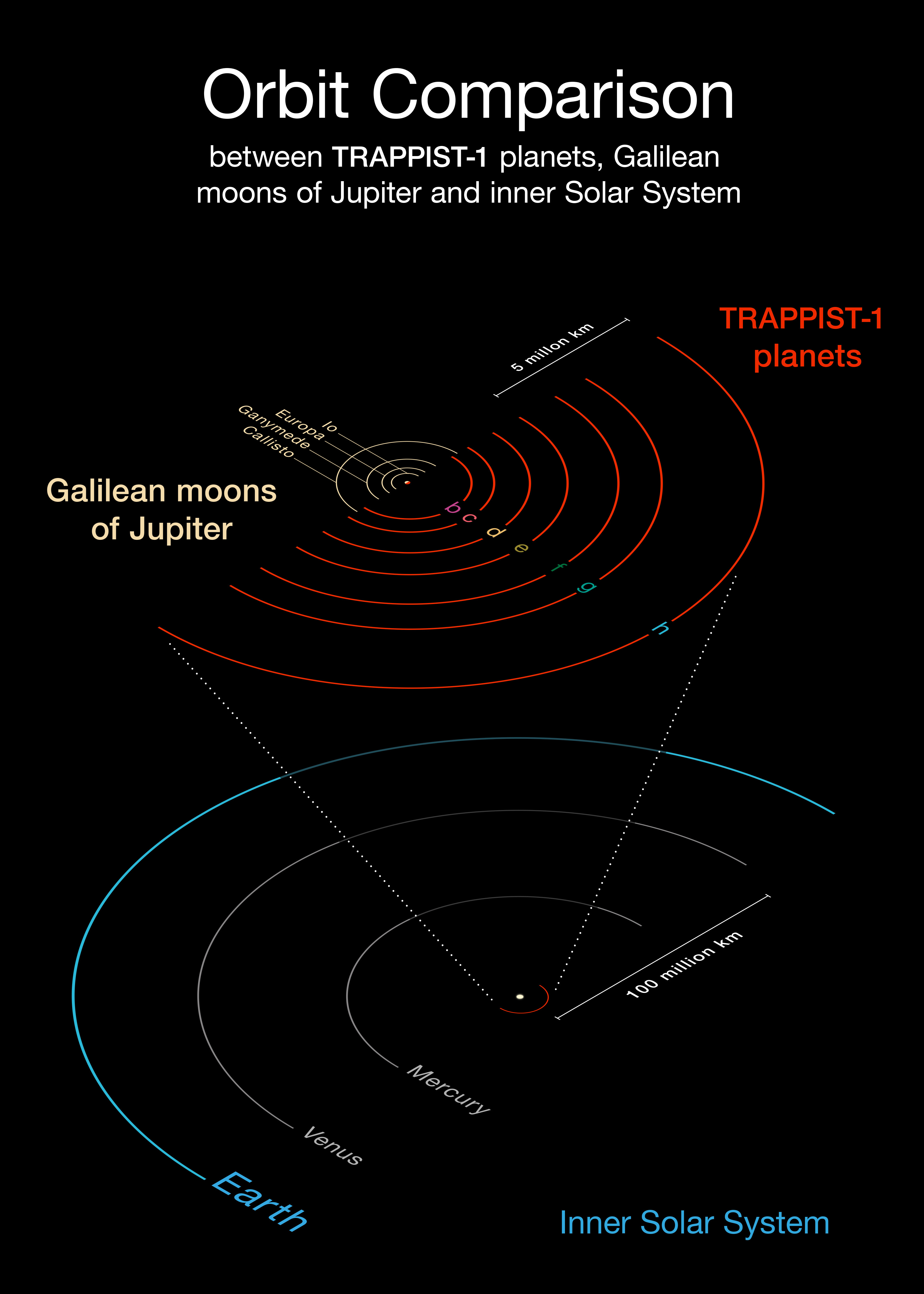
Comparison of the orbits of the TRAPPIST-1 planets with the Solar System and Jupiter's moons

TRAPPIST-1 is orbited by seven planets, designated TRAPPIST-1b, 1c, 1d, 1e, 1f, 1g and 1h in alphabetic order going out from the star. (Note: Exoplanets are named in order of discovery as "b", "c", and so on; if multiple planets are discovered at once they are named in order of increasing orbital period. The term "TRAPPIST-1a" is used to refer to the star itself.) These planets have orbital periods ranging from 1.5 to 19 days, at distances of 0.011–0.059 astronomical units (Note: One astronomical unit (AU) is the mean distance between the Earth and the Sun.) (1.7–8.9 million km).

All the planets are much closer to their star than Mercury is to the Sun, with the distance between TRAPPIST-1b and 1c at syzygy being only twice that between the Earth and Moon, making the TRAPPIST-1 system very compact. Kral et al. (2018) did not detect any comets around TRAPPIST-1, and Marino et al. (2020) found no evidence of a Kuiper belt, although it is uncertain whether a Solar System-like belt around TRAPPIST-1 would be observable from Earth. Observations with the Atacama Large Millimeter Array found no evidence of a circumstellar dust disk.

The inclinations of planetary orbits relative to each other are less than 0.1 degrees, (Note: For comparison, Earth's orbit around the Sun is inclined by about 1.578 degrees.) making TRAPPIST-1 the flattest planetary system in the NASA Exoplanet Archive. The orbits are highly circular, with minimal eccentricities (Note: The inner two planets' orbits may be circular; the others could have a small eccentricity.) and are well aligned with the spin axis of TRAPPIST-1. The planets orbit in the same plane and, from the perspective of the Solar System, transit TRAPPIST-1 during their orbit and frequently pass in front of each other.

=== Size and composition ===
The radii of the planets are estimated to range between 77.5^{+1.4}_{−1.4}% and 112.9^{+1.5}_{−1.3}% of Earth's radius. The planet/star mass ratio of the TRAPPIST-1 system resembles that of the moon/planet ratio of the Solar System's gas giants.

The TRAPPIST-1 planets are expected to have compositions that resemble each other as well as that of Earth. The estimated densities of the planets are lower than Earth's which may imply that they have large amounts of volatile chemicals. (Note: A volatile is an element or compound with a low boiling point, such as ammonia, carbon dioxide, methane, nitrogen, sulfur dioxide, or water.) Alternatively, their cores may be smaller than that of Earth and therefore they may be rocky planets with less iron than that of Earth, include large amounts of elements other than iron, or their iron may exist in an oxidised form rather than as a core. Their densities are too low for a pure magnesium silicate composition, (Note: The composition of the mantle of rocky planets is typically approximated as a magnesium silicate.) requiring the presence of lower-density compounds such as water. Planets b, d, f, g and h are expected to contain large quantities of volatile chemicals. The planets may have deep atmospheres and oceans, and contain vast amounts of ice. Subsurface oceans, buried under icy shells, would form in the colder planets. Several compositions are possible considering the large uncertainties in their densities. The photospheric features of the star may introduce inaccuracies in measurements of the properties of TRAPPIST-1's planets, including their densities being underestimated by 8^{+20}_{-7} per cent, and incorrect estimates of their water content.

=== Resonance and tides ===
Animation of TRAPPIST-1 exoplanets transiting their host star, with effects on the star's light curve

The planets are in orbital resonances. The durations of their orbits have ratios of 8:5, 5:3, 3:2, 3:2, 4:3 and 3:2 between neighbouring planet pairs, and each set of three is in a Laplace resonance. (Note: A Laplace resonance is an orbital resonance that consists of three bodies, similar to the Galilean moons Europa, Ganymede, and Io around Jupiter.) Simulations have shown such resonances can remain stable over billions of years but that their stability is strongly dependent on initial conditions. Many configurations become unstable after less than a million years. The resonances enhance the exchange of angular momentum between the planets, resulting in measurable variations—earlier or later—in their transit times in front of TRAPPIST-1. These variations yield information on the planetary system, such as the masses of the planets, when other techniques are not available. The resonances and the proximity to the host star have led to comparisons between the TRAPPIST-1 system and the Galilean moons of Jupiter. Kepler-223 is another exoplanet system with a TRAPPIST-1-like long resonance.

The closeness of the planets to TRAPPIST-1 results in tidal interactions stronger than those on Earth. Models suggest all the planets may have reached an equilibrium with slow planetary rotations and tidal locking, which can lead to the synchronisation of a planet's rotation to its revolution around its star. (Note: This causes one half of the planet to perpetually face the star in a permanent day and the other half perpetually face away from the star in a permanent night.) However, interactions among the planets could prevent them from reaching full synchronisation, which would have important implications for the planets' climates. These interactions could force periodic or episodic full rotations of the planets' surfaces with respect to the star on timescales of several Earth years. Vinson, Tamayo and Hansen (2019) found the planets TRAPPIST-1d, e and f likely have chaotic rotations due to mutual interactions, preventing them from becoming synchronised to their star. Lack of synchronisation potentially makes the planets more habitable. Other processes that can prevent synchronous rotation are torques induced by stable triaxial deformation of the planets, (Note: Where a planet, rather than being a symmetric sphere, has a different radius for each of the three main axes.) which would allow them to enter 3:2 resonances.

The planets are likely to undergo substantial tidal heating due to deformations arising from their orbital eccentricities and gravitational interactions with one another. Such heating would facilitate volcanism and degassing (Note: Degassing is the release of gases, which can end up forming an atmosphere, from the mantle or from magma.) especially on the innermost planets, with degassing facilitating the establishment of atmospheres. According to Luger et al. (2017), tidal heating of the four innermost planets is expected to be greater than Earth's inner heat flux. For the outer planets Quick et al. (2020) noted that their tidal heating could be comparable to that in the Solar System bodies Europa, Enceladus and Triton, and may be sufficient to drive detectable cryovolcanic activity. On the other hand, Thomas et al. (2025) assumed that the constraints on atmospheric composition imply that volcanic activity on most TRAPPIST-1 planets would be less than on Earth.

Tidal heating could influence temperatures of the night sides and cold areas where volatiles may be trapped, and gases are expected to accumulate; it would also influence the properties of any subsurface oceans where cryovolcanism, (Note: Cryovolcanism occurs when steam or liquid water, or aqueous fluids, erupt to a planet surface ordinarily too cold to host liquid water.) volcanism and hydrothermal venting (Note: Hydrothermal vents are hot springs that occur underwater, and are hypothesised to be places where life could originate.) could occur. It may further be sufficient to melt the mantles of the four innermost planets, in whole or in part, potentially forming subsurface magma oceans. This heat source is likely dominant over radioactive decay, both of which have substantial uncertainties and are considerably less than the stellar radiation received. Intense tides could fracture the planets' crusts even if they are not sufficiently strong to trigger the onset of plate tectonics. Tides can also occur in the planetary atmospheres.

=== Skies and impact of stellar light ===
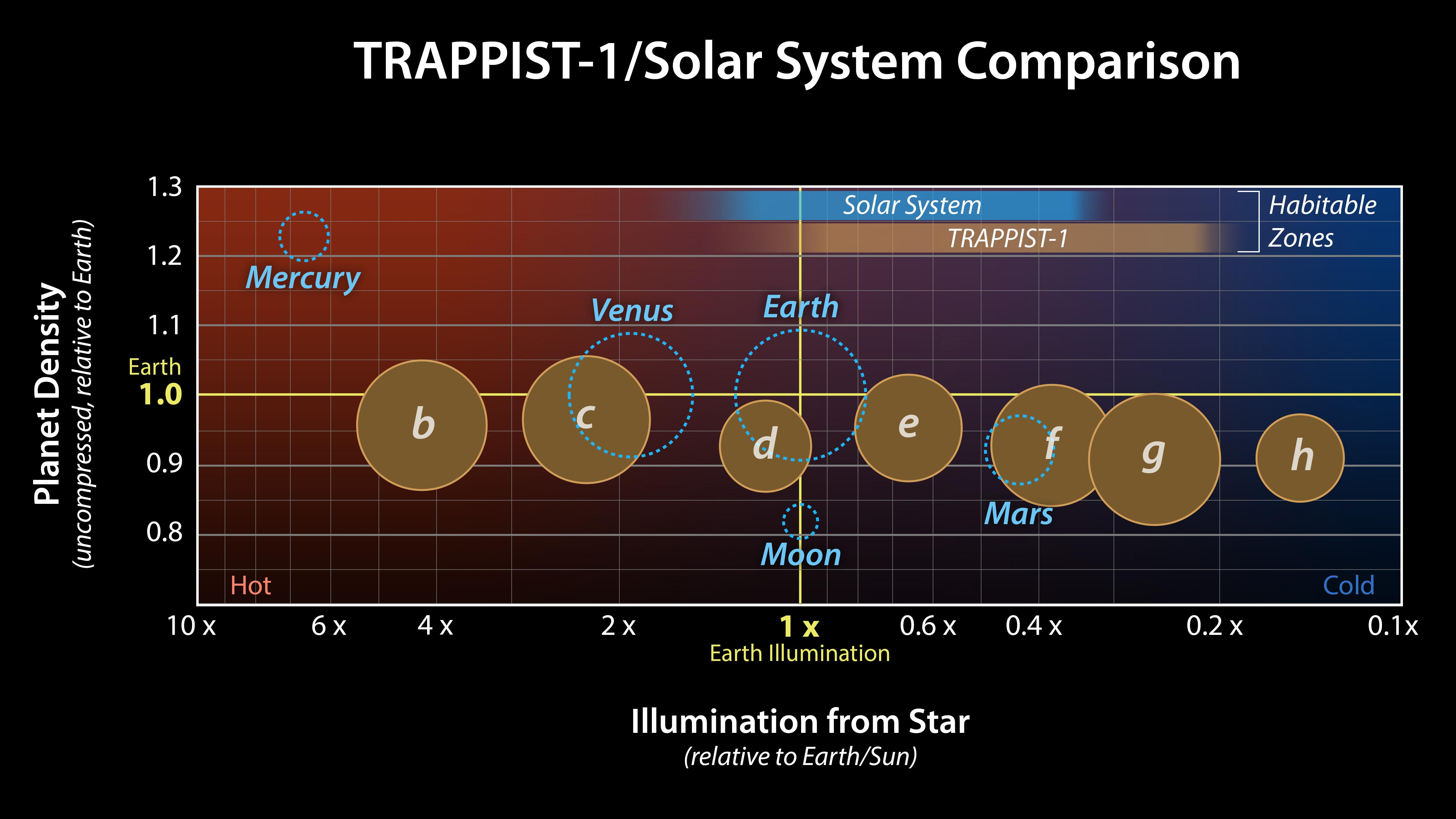
Relative sizes, densities (Note: Not accounting for gravitational compression.) and illumination of the TRAPPIST-1 system compared to the inner planets of the Solar System

Because most of TRAPPIST-1's radiation is in the infrared region, there may be very little visible light on the planets' surfaces; Amaury Triaud, one of the system's co-discoverers, said the skies would never be brighter than Earth's sky at sunset and only a little brighter than a night with a full moon. Ignoring atmospheric effects, illumination would be orange-red. For TRAPPIST-1e, the central star would be four times as wide in the sky as the Sun in Earth's. All of the planets would be visible from each other and would, in many cases, appear larger than Earth's Moon in the sky of Earth, and each would be recognisable as a planet rather than a star. They would undergo noticeable retrograde motions in the sky. Observers on TRAPPIST-1e, f and g, however, could never experience a total stellar eclipse. (Note: That is, the inner planets could never cover the entire disk of TRAPPIST-1 from the vantage point of these planets.) Assuming the existence of atmospheres, the star's long-wavelength radiation would be absorbed to a greater degree by water and carbon dioxide than sunlight on Earth; it would also be scattered less by the atmosphere and less reflected by ice, although the development of highly reflective hydrohalite ice may negate this effect. The same amount of radiation results in a warmer planet compared to Sun-like irradiation; more radiation would be absorbed by the planets' upper atmosphere than by the lower layers, making the atmosphere more stable and less prone to convection.

=== Habitable zone ===
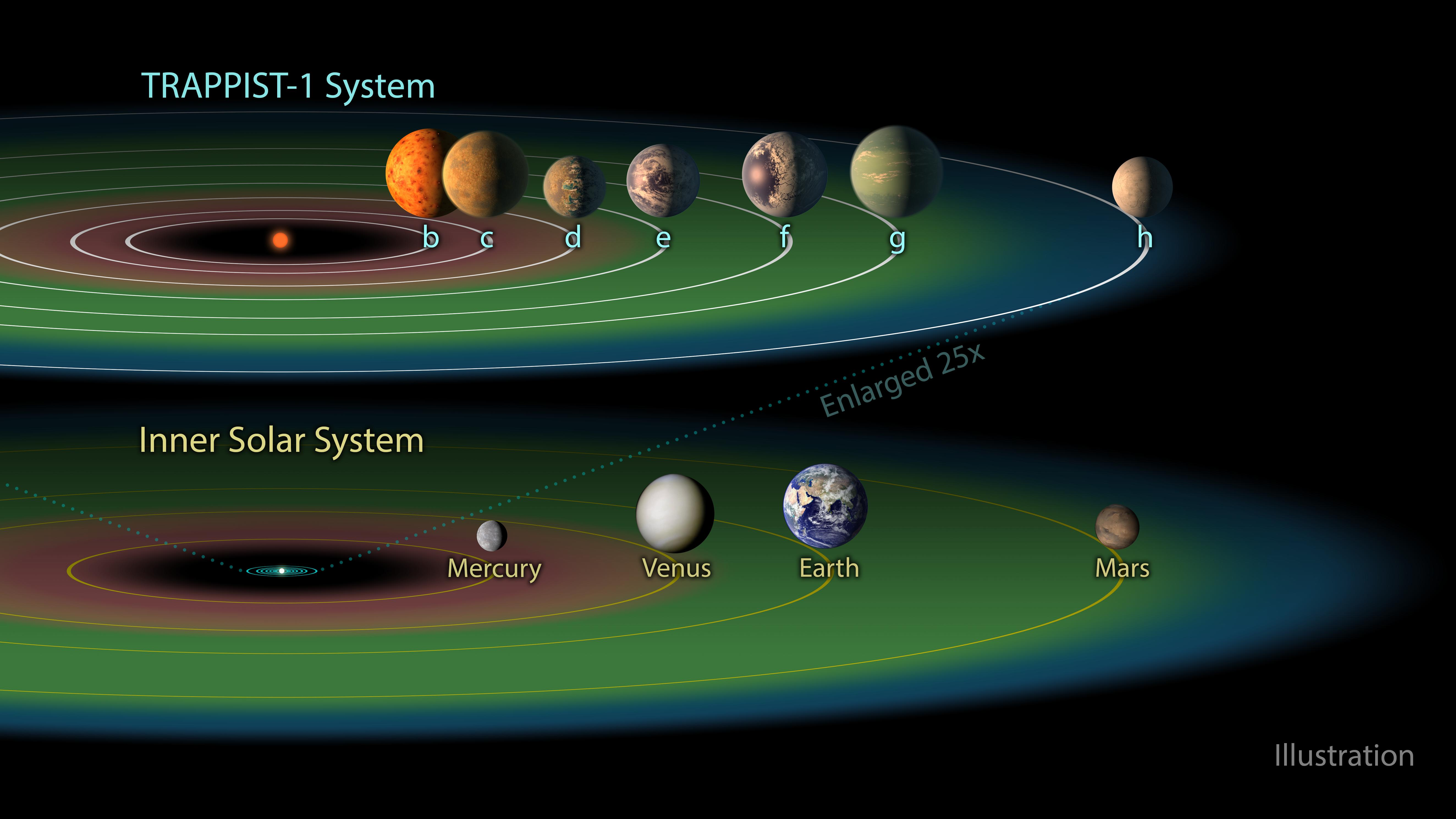
Habitable zones of TRAPPIST-1 and the Solar System. The displayed planetary surfaces are speculative.

For a dim star like TRAPPIST-1, the habitable zone (Note: The habitable zone is the region around a star where temperatures are neither too hot nor too cold for the existence of liquid water; it is also called the "Goldilocks zone".) is located closer to the star than for the Sun. Three or four planets might be located in the habitable zone; these include e, f and g; or d, e and f. As of 2017, this is the largest-known number of planets within the habitable zone of any known star or star system. The presence of liquid water on any of the planets depends on several other factors, such as albedo (reflectivity), the presence of an atmosphere, and any greenhouse effect. Surface conditions are difficult to constrain without better knowledge of the planets' atmospheres. A synchronously rotating planet might not entirely freeze over if it receives too little radiation from its star because the day-side could be sufficiently heated to halt the progress of glaciation. Other factors for the occurrence of liquid water include the presence of oceans and vegetation; the reflective properties of the land surface; the configuration of continents and oceans; the presence of clouds; and sea ice dynamics. The effects of volcanic activity may extend the system's habitable zone to TRAPPIST-1h. Even if the outer planets are too cold to be habitable, they may have ice-covered subsurface oceans that may harbour life.

Intense extreme ultraviolet (XUV) and X-ray radiation can split water into hydrogen and oxygen, and heat the upper atmosphere until they escape from the planet. This was thought to have been particularly important early in the star's history, when radiation was more intense and could have heated every planet's water to its boiling point. This process is believed to have driven water from Venus. In the case of TRAPPIST-1, different studies with different assumptions on the kinetics, energetics and XUV emissions have come to different conclusions on whether any TRAPPIST-1 planet may retain substantial amounts of water. Because the planets are most likely synchronised to their host star, any water present could become trapped on the planets' night sides and would be unavailable to support life unless heat transport by the atmosphere or tidal heating are intense enough to melt ice.

=== Moons ===
No moons with a size comparable to Earth's have been detected in the TRAPPIST-1 system, and they are unlikely in such a densely packed planetary system. This is because moons would likely be either destroyed by their planet's gravity after entering its Roche limit (Note: The Roche limit is the distance at which a body is ripped apart by tides.) or stripped from the planet by leaving its Hill radius (Note: The Hill radius is the maximum distance at which a planet's gravity can hold a moon without the star's gravity taking the moon away.) Although the TRAPPIST-1 planets appear in an analysis of potential exomoon hosts, they do not appear in the list of habitable-zone exoplanets that could host a moon for at least one Hubble time, a timeframe slightly longer than the current age of the Universe. Despite these factors, it is still theoretically possible the planets could host moons.

=== Magnetic effects ===
The TRAPPIST-1 planets are expected to be within the Alfvén surface of their host star, the area around the star within which any planet would directly magnetically interact with the corona of the star, possibly destabilising any atmosphere the planet has. Stellar energetic particles would not create a substantial radiation hazard for organisms on TRAPPIST-1 planets if atmospheres reached pressures of about 1 bar. Estimates of radiation fluxes have considerable uncertainties due to the lack of knowledge about the structure of TRAPPIST-1's magnetic field. Induction heating from the star's time-varying electrical and magnetic fields may occur on its planets but this would make no substantial contribution to their energy balance and is vastly exceeded by tidal heating.

=== Formation history ===
The TRAPPIST-1 planets most likely formed farther from the star and migrated inward, although it is possible they formed in their current locations. According to the most popular hypothesis on the formation of the TRAPPIST-1 planets (Ormel et al. (2017)), the planets formed when a streaming instability (Note: A streaming instability is a process where interactions between gas and solid particles cause the latter to clump together in filaments. These filaments can give rise to the precursor bodies of planets.) at the water-ice line gave rise to precursor bodies, which accumulated additional fragments and migrated inward, eventually giving rise to planets. The migration may initially have been fast and later slowed, and tidal effects may have further influenced the formation processes. The distribution of the fragments would have controlled the final mass of the planets, which would consist of approximately 10% water, consistent with observational inference. Resonant chains of planets like those of TRAPPIST-1 usually become unstable when the gas disk that gave rise to them dissipates but, in this case, the planets remained in resonance. The resonance may have been either present from the system's formation and was preserved when the planets simultaneously moved inward, or it might have formed later when inward-migrating planets accumulated at the outer edge of the gas disk and interacted with each other. Inward-migrating planets would contain substantial amounts of water—too much for it to entirely escape—whereas planets that formed in their current location would most likely lose all water. According to Flock et al. (2019), the orbital distance of the innermost planet TRAPPIST-1b is consistent with the expected radius of an inward-moving planet around a star that was one order of magnitude brighter in the past, and with the cavity in the protoplanetary disc created by TRAPPIST-1's magnetic field. Alternatively, TRAPPIST-1h may have formed in or close to its current location.

The presence of other bodies and planetesimals early in the system's history would have destabilised the TRAPPIST-1 planets' resonance if the bodies were massive enough. Raymond et al. (2021) concluded the TRAPPIST-1 planets assembled in one to two million years, after which time little additional mass was accreted. This would limit any late delivery of water to the planets and also implies the planets cleared the neighbourhood (Note: According to the International Astronomical Union criteria, a body has to clear its neighbourhood to qualify as a planet in the Solar System.) of any additional material. The lack of giant impact events (the rapid formation of the planets would have quickly exhausted pre-planetary material) would help the planets preserve their volatile materials, only once the planet formation process was complete.

Due to a combination of high irradiation, the greenhouse effect of water vapour atmospheres, and remnant heat from the process of planet assembly, the TRAPPIST-1 planets would likely have initially had molten surfaces. Eventually the surfaces would cool until the magma oceans solidified, which in the case of TRAPPIST-1b may have taken between a few billions of years, or a few millions of years. The outer planets would then have become cold enough for water vapour to condense.

== List of planets ==
The TRAPPIST-1 system with distances to scale, compared with the Moon-Earth distance

=== TRAPPIST-1b ===
TRAPPIST-1b has a semi-major axis of 0.0115 AU (1.72 million km) and an orbital period of 1.51 days. It is tidally locked to its star. The planet is outside the habitable zone; its expected irradiation is more than four times that of Earth and the JWST has measured a brightness temperature of 508+26
−27 K on the day side. TRAPPIST-1b has a slightly larger measured radius and mass than Earth, but estimates of its density imply it does not exclusively consist of rock. Owing to its black-body temperature of 124 °C (397 K), TRAPPIST-1b may have had a runaway greenhouse effect similar to that of Venus; JWST observations indicate that it has either no atmosphere at all or a very thin one (Note: TRAPPIST-1b and c have been used as possible templates for what an atmosphereless transit spectrum looks like in the TRAPPIST-1 system, a crucial measure to distinguish between atmospheric signals and stellar contamination.) If it has no atmosphere, the surface is expected to be subject to rapid volcanic overprinting which is expected given the amount of tidal heating. Based on several climate models, the planet would have been desiccated by TRAPPIST-1's stellar wind and radiation; it could be quickly losing hydrogen and therefore any hydrogen-dominated atmosphere. (Note: On the basis of the Lyman-alpha radiation emissions, TRAPPIST-1b may be losing hydrogen at a rate of 4.6×10^{7} g/s.) Water, if any exists, could persist only in specific settings on the planet, whose surface temperature could be as high as 1,200 °C (1,470 K), making TRAPPIST-1b a candidate magma ocean planet.

=== TRAPPIST-1c ===
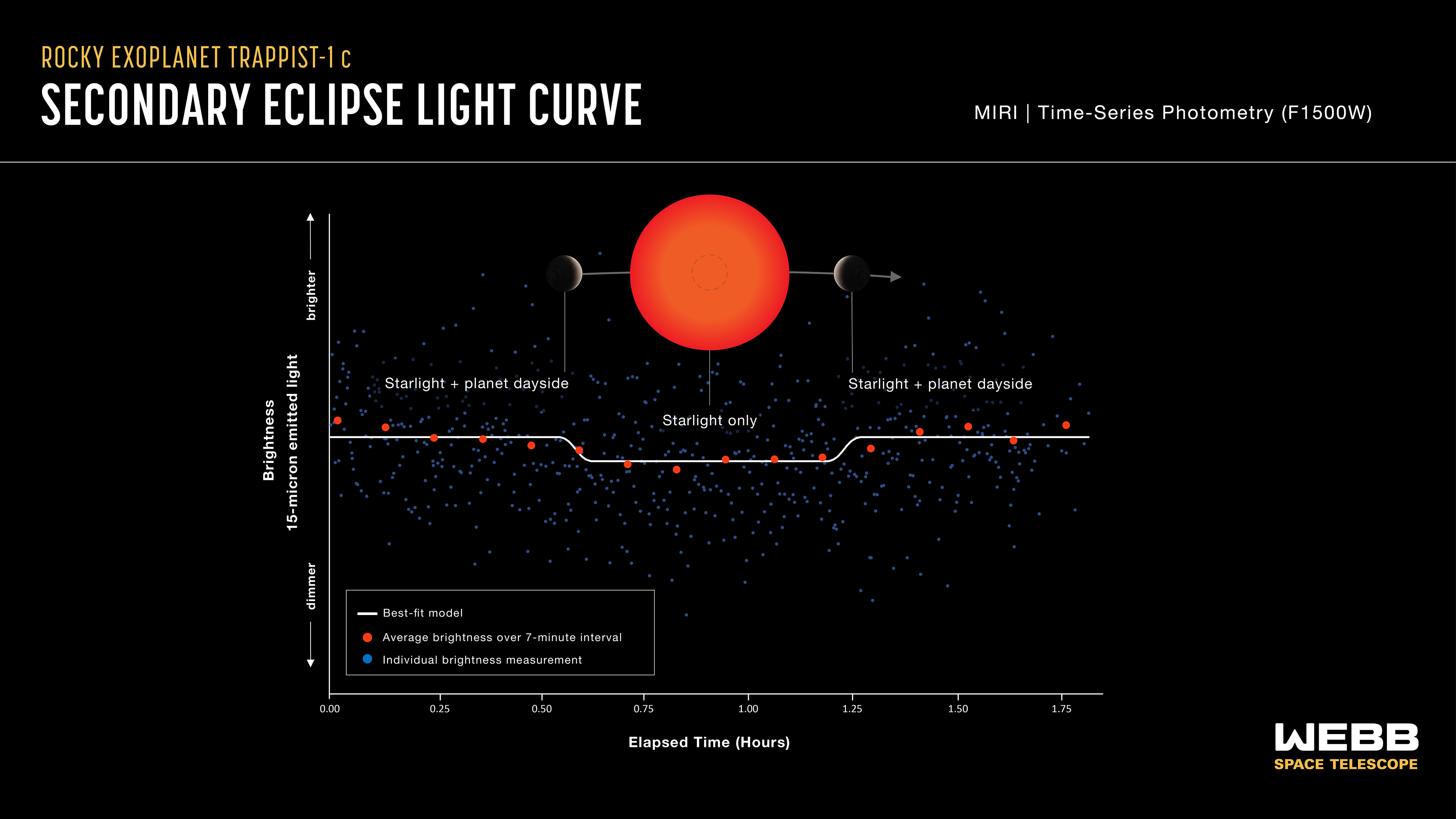
Infrared measurements by the NASA / ESA / Canadian Space Agency / James Webb Space Telescope of TRAPPIST-1 c indicate that it is likely not as Venus-like as once imagined.

TRAPPIST-1c has a semi-major axis of 0.0158 AU (2.36 million km) and orbits its star every 2.42 days. It is close enough to TRAPPIST-1 to be tidally locked. JWST observations have ruled out the existence of Venus-like atmospheres, or CO_{2}-rich atmospheres without a temperature inversion. Airlessness is possible, but water vapour- or oxygen-rich atmospheres are not ruled out. These data imply that relative to Earth or Venus, TRAPPIST-1c has a lower carbon content. TRAPPIST-1c is outside the habitable zone as it receives about twice as much stellar irradiation as Earth and thus either is or has been a runaway greenhouse. Based on several climate models, the planet would have been desiccated by TRAPPIST-1's stellar wind and radiation. TRAPPIST-1c could harbour water only in specific settings on its surface. Observations in 2017 showed no escaping hydrogen, but observations by the Hubble Space Telescope (HST) in 2020 indicated that hydrogen may be escaping at a rate of 1.4×10^{7} g/s.

=== TRAPPIST-1d ===
TRAPPIST-1d has a semi-major axis of 0.0223 AU (3.34 million km) and an orbital period of 4.05 days. It is more massive but less dense than Mars. Based on fluid dynamical arguments, TRAPPIST-1d is expected to have weak temperature gradients on its surface if it is tidally locked, and may have significantly different stratospheric dynamics than that of Earth. Several climate models suggest that the planet may or may not have been desiccated by TRAPPIST-1's stellar wind and radiation; density estimates, if confirmed, indicate it is not dense enough to consist solely of rock. The current state of TRAPPIST-1d depends on its rotation and climatic factors like cloud feedback; (Note: Clouds on the day side reflecting starlight could cool TRAPPIST-1d down to temperatures that allow the presence of liquid water.) it is inside of, or close to, the inner edge of the habitable zone, but the existence of either liquid water or alternatively a runaway greenhouse effect (that would render it uninhabitable) are dependent on detailed atmospheric conditions. Water could persist in specific settings on the planet.

=== TRAPPIST-1e ===
TRAPPIST-1e has a semi-major axis of 0.0293 AU (4.38 million km) and orbits its star every 6.10 days. It has a density similar to that of Earth. Based on several climate models, the planet is the most likely of the system to have retained its water, and the most likely to have liquid water for many climate states. A dedicated climate model project called TRAPPIST-1 Habitable Atmosphere Intercomparison (THAI) has been launched to study its potential climate states. Based on observations of its Lyman-alpha radiation emissions, TRAPPIST-1e may be losing hydrogen at a rate of 0.6×10^{7} g/s.

TRAPPIST-1e is in a comparable position within the habitable zone to that of Proxima Centauri b, (Note: The exoplanet Proxima Centauri b resides in the habitable zone of the nearest star to the Solar System.) which also has an Earth-like density. TRAPPIST-1e could have retained masses of water equivalent to several of Earth's oceans. Moderate quantities of carbon dioxide could warm TRAPPIST-1e to temperatures suitable for the presence of liquid water.

=== TRAPPIST-1f ===
TRAPPIST-1f has a semi-major axis of 0.0385 AU (5.76 million km) and orbits its star every 9.21 days. It is likely too distant from its host star to sustain liquid water, being instead an entirely glaciated snowball planet that might host a subsurface ocean. Moderate quantities of CO_{2} could warm TRAPPIST-1f to temperatures suitable for the presence of liquid water. Lakes or ponds with liquid water might form in places where tidal heating is concentrated. TRAPPIST-1f may have retained masses of water equivalent to several of Earth's oceans and which could comprise up to half of the planet's mass; it could thus be an ocean planet. (Note: Ocean bodies can still be referred to as such when they are covered by ice.)

=== TRAPPIST-1g ===
TRAPPIST-1g has a semi-major axis of 0.0469 AU (7.02 million km) and orbits its star every 12.35 days. It is likely too distant from its host star to sustain liquid water, being instead a snowball planet that might host a subsurface ocean. Moderate quantities of CO_{2} or internal heat from radioactive decay and tidal heating may warm its surface to above the melting point of water. TRAPPIST-1g may have retained masses of water equivalent to several of Earth's oceans; density estimates of the planet, if confirmed, indicate it is not dense enough to consist solely of rock. Up to half of its mass may be water.

=== TRAPPIST-1h ===
TRAPPIST-1h has a semi-major axis of 0.0619 AU (9.28 million km), it is the system's least-massive-confirmed planet and orbits its star every 18.77 days. It is likely too distant from its host star to sustain liquid water and may be a snowball planet, or have a methane/nitrogen atmosphere resembling that of Titan. It might host a subsurface ocean. Large quantities of CO_{2}, hydrogen, or methane, or internal heat from radioactive decay and tidal heating, would be needed to warm TRAPPIST-1h to the point where liquid water could exist. TRAPPIST-1h could have retained masses of water equivalent to several of Earth's oceans.

=== Candidate planet TRAPPIST-1i ===
TRAPPIST-1i is a candidate planet identified in 2025 from transit photometry by the James Webb Space Telescope (JWST). If confirmed, it would be the outermost planet in the system, boosting the number of planets to eight; the highest of any exoplanetary system known, tied with Kepler-90. The planet's radius, deduced from transit data, is about 20% that of Earth (about the size of Neptune's moon Triton), which would make it the smallest planet known. Although the planet's existence has been predicted by transit timing variations of TRAPPIST-1h and its estimated location seems to match predictions by the Titius–Bode Law, the detection of the planet by JWST is tentative, and the observed transit might instead be the occultation of TRAPPIST-1b by TRAPPIST-1c. A Bayesian information criterion also prefers the exclusion of TRAPPIST-1i.

=== Data table ===
TRAPPIST-1 planets data table
| Planet | Mass (M_{🜨}) | Semi-major axis (au) | Semi-major axis (km) | Orbital period (days) | Orbital eccentricity | Orbital inclination | Radius (R_{🜨}) | Radiant flux | Temperature | Surface gravity (g) | ORb (Note: Approximate orbital resonance with TRAPPIST-1b) | ORi (Note: Approximate orbital resonance with inward planet) |
|---|---|---|---|---|---|---|---|---|---|---|---|---|
| b | 1.374 ±0.069 | 0.01154 ±0.0001 | 1,726,000 ±15,000 km | 1.510826 ±0.000006 | 0.00622 ±0.00304 | 89.728 ±0.165° | 1.116^{+0.014}_{−0.012} | 4.153 ±0.160 | 397.6±3.8K (124.5 ± 3.8 °C; 256.0 ± 6.8 °F) (Note: Measured surface temperature of 503 K (230 °C; 446 °F).) | 1.102 ±0.052 | — | — |
| c | 1.308 ±0.056 | 0.01580 ±0.00013 | 2,370,000 ±19,500 | 2.421937 ±0.000018 | 0.00654 ±0.00188 | 89.778 ±0.118° | 1.097^{+0.014}_{−0.012} | 2.214 ±0.085 | 339.7±3.3K (66.6 ± 3.3 °C; 151.8 ± 5.9 °F) | 1.086 ±0.043 | 5:8 | 5:8 |
| d | 0.388 ±0.012 | 0.02227 ±0.00019 | 3,340,500 ±28,500 | 4.049219 ±0.000026 | 0.00837 ±0.00093 | 89.896 ±0.077° | 0.770^{+0.011}_{−0.010} | 1.115 ±0.04 | 286.2±2.8K (13.1 ± 2.8 °C; 55.5 ± 5.0 °F) | 0.624 ±0.019 | 3:8 | 3:5 |
| e | 0.692 ±0.022 | 0.02925 ±0.00025 | 4,387,500 ±37,500 | 6.101013 ±0.000035 | 0.00510 ±0.00058 | 89.793 ±0.048° | 0.920^{+0.013}_{−0.012} | 0.646 ±0.025 | 249.7±2.4K (−23.5 ± 2.4 °C; −10.2 ± 4.3 °F) | 0.817 ±0.024 | 1:4 | 2:3 |
| f | 1.039 ±0.031 | 0.03849 ±0.00033 | 5,773,500 ±49,500 | 9.207540 ±0.000032 | 0.01007 ±0.00068 | 89.740 ±0.019° | 1.045^{+0.013}_{−0.012} | 0.373 ±0.014 | 217.7±2.1K (−55.5 ± 2.1 °C; −67.8 ± 3.8 °F) | 0.951 ±0.024 | 1:6 | 2:3 |
| g | 1.321 ±0.038 | 0.04683 ±0.0004 | 7,024,500 ±60,000 | 12.352446 ±0.000054 | 0.00208 ±0.00058 | 89.742 ±0.012° | 1.129^{+0.015}_{−0.013} | 0.252 ±0.010 | 197.3±1.9K (−75.8 ± 1.9 °C; −104.5 ± 3.4 °F) | 1.035 ±0.026 | 1:8 | 3:4 |
| h | 0.326 ±0.020 | 0.06189 ±0.00053 | 9,283,500 ±79,500 | 18.772866 ±0.000214 | 0.00567 ±0.00121 | 89.805 ±0.013° | 0.775^{+0.014}_{−0.014} | 0.144 ±0.006 | 171.7±1.7K (−101.5 ± 1.7 °C; −150.6 ± 3.1 °F) | 0.570 ±0.038 | 1:12 | 2:3 |
| i (unconfirmed) | — | 0.081 ±0.010 | 12,000,000 ±1,000,000 | 25.0 ±1.3 | — | 89.80 ±0.18 | 0.239^{+0.036}_{−0.046} | — | — | — | — | — |

== Potential planetary atmospheres ==
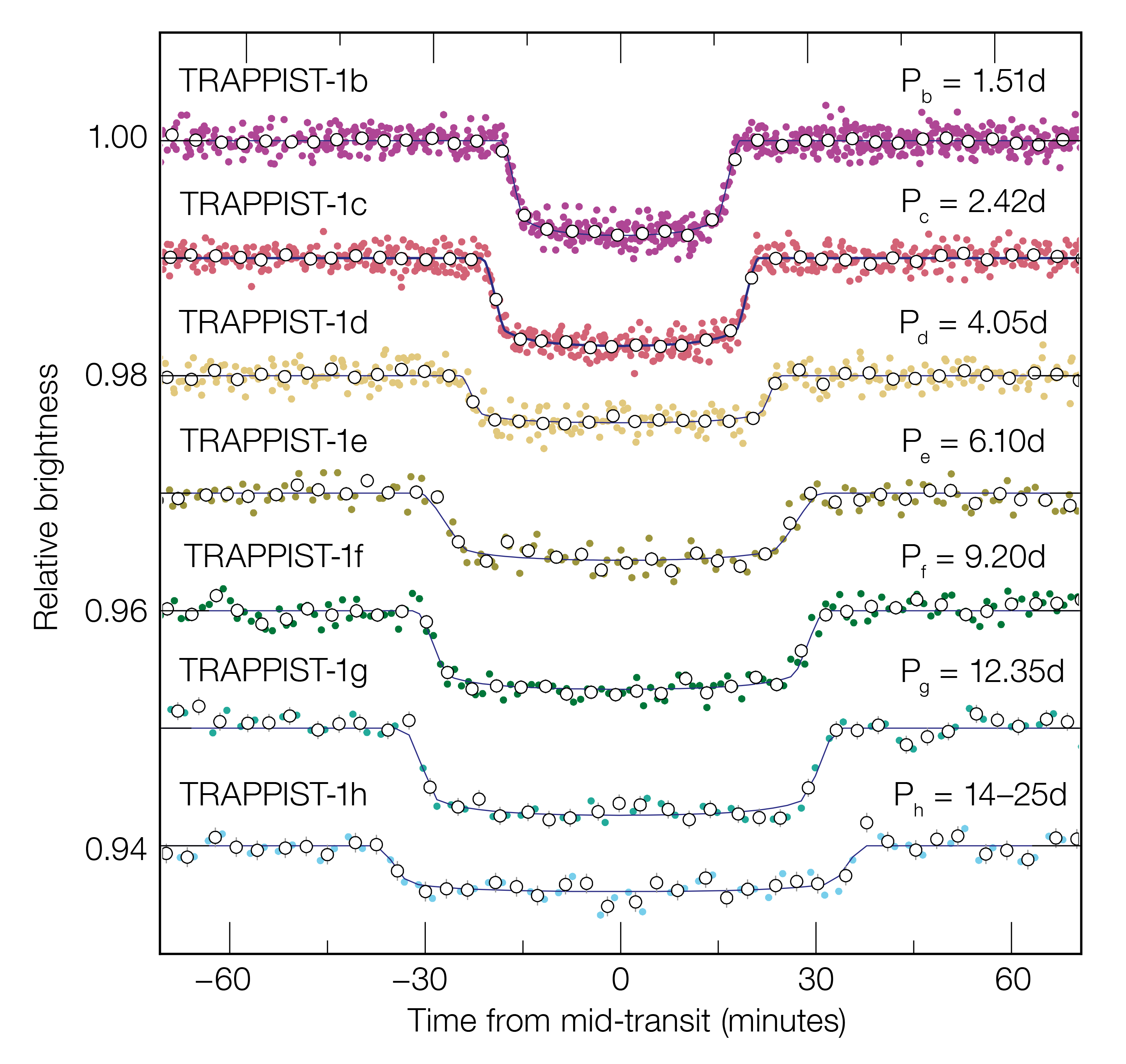
Graph showing dips in brightness in TRAPPIST-1 star by the planet's transits or obstruction of starlight. Larger planets create deeper dips and farther planets create longer dips.

TRAPPIST-1's planets have been prospected by the JWST for the possible existence of atmospheres. As of 2023, the existence of an atmosphere around TRAPPIST-1b has been ruled out although some atmosphere scenarios are still possible. As of 2025, whether TRAPPIST-1c has an atmosphere is contentious, if TRAPPIST-1d has an atmosphere it must have a large molecular weight (Note: Thus, dominated by elements heavier than hydrogen and helium.) and be largely devoid of infrared-active species, (Note: Ammonia, carbon dioxide, methane, sulfur dioxide and water, but not nitrogen.) and whether TRAPPIST-1e has an atmosphere is unclear as of 2025—observations allow both an atmosphere containing traces of methane, and the absence of an atmosphere. The outer planets are more likely to have atmospheres than the inner planets. (Note: Computer modelling indicates that the non-existence of an atmosphere around TRAPPIST-1 b, c and d does not imply the lack of same around the other planets. Bourrier et al. (2017) interpreted UV absorption data from the Hubble Space Telescope as implying the outer TRAPPIST-1 planets still have an atmosphere.) Several studies have simulated how different atmospheric scenarios would look to observers, and the chemical processes underpinning these atmospheric compositions. The visibility of an exoplanet and of its atmosphere scale with the inverse square of the radius of its host star. Detection of individual components of the atmospheres—in particular CO_{2}, ozone and water—would also be possible, although different components would require different conditions and different numbers of transits. A contamination of the atmospheric signals through patterns on the stellar surface is a major impediment to detection, as the transmission spectra vary strongly between observations.

The existence of atmospheres around TRAPPIST-1's planets depends on the balance between the amount of atmosphere initially present, its rate of evaporation, and the rate at which it is built back up by meteorite impacts, (Note: Impact events can also remove atmospheres, but a high rate of such "impact erosion" implies a mass of meteorites that is not compatible with the properties of the TRAPPIST-1 system although it might meaningfully restrict the water mass of the outer planets.) incoming material from a protoplanetary disk, (Note: A protoplanetary disk is a disk of matter surrounding a star. Planets are thought to form in such disks.) and outgassing and volcanic activity. Impact events may be particularly important in the outer planets because they can both add and remove volatiles; addition is likely dominant in the outermost planets where impact velocities are slower. The formation conditions of the planets would give them large initial quantities of volatile materials, including oceans over 100 times larger than those of Earth, but the non-detection of water-rich atmospheres implies that a dry origin is also possible.

If the planets are tidally locked to TRAPPIST-1, surfaces that permanently face away from the star can cool sufficiently for any atmosphere to freeze out on the night side. This frozen-out atmosphere could be recycled through glacier-like flows to the day side with assistance from tidal or geothermal heating from below, or could be stirred by impact events. These processes could allow an atmosphere to persist. In a carbon dioxide (CO_{2}) atmosphere, carbon-dioxide ice is denser than water ice, under which it tends to be buried. CO_{2}–water compounds named clathrates (Note: A clathrate is a chemical compound where one compound (or chemical element) e.g. carbon dioxide (or xenon), is trapped within a cage-like assembly of molecules from another compound.) can form. Further complications are a potential runaway feedback loop between melting ice and evaporation, and the greenhouse effect.

Numerical modelling and observations constrain the properties of hypothetical atmospheres around TRAPPIST-1 planets:

- Theoretical calculations and observations have ruled out the possibility the TRAPPIST-1 planets have hydrogen-dominated or helium-rich atmospheres. Hydrogen-rich exospheres (Note: The exosphere is the region of an atmosphere where density is so low that atoms or molecules no longer collide. It is formed by atmospheric escape and the presence of a hydrogen-rich exosphere implies the presence of water.) may be detectable but have not been reliably detected, except perhaps for TRAPPIST-1b and 1c by Bourrier et al. (2017).
- Water-dominated atmospheres, though suggested by some density estimates, are improbable for the planets because they are expected to be unstable under the conditions around TRAPPIST-1, especially early in the star's life. The spectral properties of the planets imply they do not have a cloud-free, water-rich atmosphere.
- Oxygen-dominated atmospheres can form when radiation splits water into hydrogen and oxygen, and the hydrogen escapes due to its lighter mass. The existence of such an atmosphere and its mass depends on the initial water mass, on whether the oxygen is dragged out of the atmosphere by escaping hydrogen and of the state of the planet's surface; a partially molten surface could absorb sufficient quantities of oxygen to remove an atmosphere.
- Atmospheres formed by ammonia and/or methane near TRAPPIST-1 would be destroyed by the star's radiation at a sufficient rate to quickly remove an atmosphere. The rate at which ammonia or methane are produced, possibly by organisms, would have to be considerably larger than that on Earth to sustain such an atmosphere. It is possible the development of organic hazes from ammonia or methane photolysis could shield the remaining molecules from degradation caused by radiation. Ducrot et al. (2020) interpreted observational data as implying methane-dominated atmospheres are unlikely around TRAPPIST-1 planets.
- Nitrogen-dominated atmospheres are particularly unstable with respect to atmospheric escape, especially on the innermost planets, although the presence of CO_{2} may slow evaporation. Unless the TRAPPIST-1 planets initially contained far more nitrogen than Earth, they are unlikely to have retained such atmospheres.
- CO_{2}-dominated atmospheres escape slowly because CO_{2} effectively radiates away energy and thus does not readily reach escape velocity; on a synchronously rotating planet, however, CO_{2} can freeze out on the night side, especially if there are no other gases in the atmosphere. The decomposition of CO_{2} caused by radiation could yield substantial amounts of oxygen, carbon monoxide (CO), and ozone.

Theoretical modelling by Krissansen-Totton and Fortney (2022) suggests the inner planets most likely have oxygen-and-CO_{2}-rich atmospheres, if any. If the planets have an atmosphere, the amount of precipitation, its form and location would be determined by the presence and position of mountains and oceans, and the rotation period. Planets in the habitable zone are expected to have an atmospheric circulation regime resembling Earth's tropical regions with largely uniform temperatures. Whether greenhouse gases can accumulate on the outer TRAPPIST-1 planets in sufficient quantities to warm them to the melting point of water is controversial; on a synchronously rotating planet, CO_{2} could freeze and precipitate on the night side, and ammonia and methane would be destroyed by XUV radiation from TRAPPIST-1. Carbon dioxide freezing-out can occur only on the outermost planets unless special conditions are met, and other volatiles do not freeze out.

=== Stability ===
Observed brightness of the TRAPPIST-1 star, showing large variation in brightness. The graph displays dips, indicating the transit of exoplanets. The planet corresponding to the dips in brightness are plotted below with diamond markers.

The emission of extreme ultraviolet (XUV) radiation by a star has an important influence on the stability of its planets' atmospheres, their composition and the habitability of their surfaces. It can cause the ongoing removal of atmospheres from planets. XUV radiation-induced atmospheric escape has been observed on gas giants. M dwarfs emit large amounts of XUV radiation; TRAPPIST-1 and the Sun emit about the same amount of XUV radiation (Note: Different sources estimate that TRAPPIST-1 emits as much as the Sun at solar minimum, the same amount or more than the Sun.) and because TRAPPIST-1's planets are much closer to the star than the Sun's, they receive much more intense (Note: The fraction of radiation in the XUV is estimated to range 6-9*10^-4 or 10^-3.51 of the total luminosity.) irradiation. TRAPPIST-1 has been emitting radiation for much longer than the Sun. All these considerations raise doubts that M dwarf planets can maintain an atmosphere, especially the innermost ones. The process of atmospheric escape has been modelled mainly in the context of hydrogen-rich atmospheres and little quantitative research has been done on those of other compositions such as water and CO_{2}.

TRAPPIST-1 has moderate to high stellar activity, (Note: Stellar activity is the occurrence of luminosity changes, mostly in the X-ray bands, caused by a star's magnetic field.) and this may be another difficulty for the persistence of atmospheres and water on the planets:

- Dwarfs of the spectral class M have intense flares; TRAPPIST-1 averages one flare every two days and about four to six superflares (Note: Flares with an energy of over 1×10^{33} ergs (1.0×10^{26} J).) per year. Such flares would have only small impacts on atmospheric temperatures but would substantially affect the stability and chemistry of atmospheres. According to Samara, Patsourakos and Georgoulis (2021), the TRAPPIST-1 planets are unlikely to be able to retain atmospheres against coronal mass ejections.
- The stellar wind from TRAPPIST-1 may have a pressure 1,000 times larger than that of the Sun at Earth's orbit, which could destabilise atmospheres of the star's planets up to planet f. The pressure would push the wind deep into the atmospheres, facilitating loss of water and evaporation of the atmospheres. Stellar wind-driven escape in the Solar System is largely independent from planetary properties such as mass, scaling instead with the stellar wind mass flux impacting the planet. Stellar wind from TRAPPIST-1 could remove the atmospheres of its planets on a timescale of 100 million to 10 billion years. Whether a planetary magnetic field would reduce or increase escape is unclear.
- Ohmic heating is the process where electrical currents excited by the stellar wind flow through parts of the atmosphere, heating it. This process might result in appreciable heating of the upper atmosphere of TRAPPIST-1b, albeit mostly in already escaping parts of the atmosphere. Around TRAPPIST-1e, f and g amounts to five to fifteen times the heating from XUV radiation; if the heat is effectively absorbed, it could destabilise the atmospheres.

The star's history also influences the atmospheres of its planets. Immediately after its formation, TRAPPIST-1 would have been in a pre-main-sequence state, which may have lasted between hundreds of millions and two billion years. While in this state, it would have been considerably brighter than it is today and the star's intense irradiation would have impacted the atmospheres of surrounding planets, vaporising all common volatiles such as ammonia, CO_{2}, sulfur dioxide and water. Thus, all of the system's planets would have been heated to a runaway greenhouse (Note: In a runaway greenhouse, all water on a planet is in the form of vapour.) for at least part of their existence. The XUV radiation would have been even higher during the pre-main-sequence stage. The pre-main sequence luminosity could have stripped a mass of water equivalent to several tens of Earth oceans from the inner planets.

== Possible life ==
Life may be possible in the TRAPPIST-1 system, and some of the star's planets are considered promising targets for its detection. On the basis of atmospheric stability, TRAPPIST-1e is theoretically the planet most likely to harbour life; the probability that it does is considerably less than that of Earth. There are an array of factors at play:

- Due to multiple interactions, TRAPPIST-1 planets are expected to have intense tides. If oceans are present, (Note: Non-ocean bearing planets can also be subject to tidal heating (or flexing), resulting in structural deformation.) the tides could: lead to alternate flooding and drying of coastal landscapes triggering chemical reactions conducive to the development of life; favour the evolution of biological rhythms such as the day-night cycle that otherwise would not develop in a synchronously rotating planet; mix oceans, thus supplying and redistributing nutrients; and stimulate periodic expansions of marine organisms similar to red tides on Earth.
- TRAPPIST-1 may not produce sufficient quantities of radiation for photosynthesis to support an Earth-like biosphere. Mullan and Bais (2018) speculated that radiation from flares may increase the photosynthetic potential of TRAPPIST-1, but according to Lingam and Loeb (2019), the potential would still be small.
- Due to the proximity of the TRAPPIST-1 planets, it is possible rock-encased microorganisms ripped (Note: For example, meteorite impacts could break off rocks from planets at a sufficient speed that they escape its gravity.) from one planet may arrive at another planet while still viable inside the rock, allowing life to spread between the planets if it originates on one.
- Too much UV radiation from a star can sterilise the surface of a planet but too little may not allow the formation of chemical compounds that give rise to life. Inadequate production of hydroxyl radicals by low stellar-UV emission may allow gases such as carbon monoxide that are toxic to higher life to accumulate in the planets' atmospheres. The possibilities range from UV fluxes from TRAPPIST-1 being unlikely to be much larger than these of early Earth—even in the event that TRAPPIST-1's emissions of UV radiation are high—to being sufficient to sterilise the planets if they do not have protective atmospheres. As of 2020 it is unclear which effect would predominate around TRAPPIST-1, although observations with the Kepler Space Telescope and the Evryscope telescopes indicate the UV flux may be insufficient for the formation of life or its sterilisation.
- Intense flaring activity of the host star—that could alter nearby planets' atmospheres irreversibly and significantly—raised doubts of the habitability of the system.
- Although initial water reservoirs could have been lost during the early life of the system due to the stellar activity, a potential subsequent water delivery event, like the late heavy bombardment in the Solar system, could replenish planetary water reservoirs.
- The outer planets in the TRAPPIST-1 system could host subsurface oceans similar to those of Enceladus and Europa in the Solar System. Chemolithotrophy, the growth of organisms based on non-organic reduced compounds, could sustain life in such oceans. Very deep oceans may be inimical to the development of life.
- Some planets of the TRAPPIST-1 system may have enough water to completely submerge their surfaces. If so, this would have important effects on the possibility of life developing on the planets, and on their climates, as weathering would decrease, starving the oceans of nutrients like phosphorus as well as potentially leading to the accumulation of carbon dioxide in their atmospheres.

TRAPPIST-1 is well suited to the search of technosignatures that would indicate the existence of past or present technology in the TRAPPIST-1 system. Searches in 2017 found only signals coming from Earth, others in 2024 found nothing although their sensitivity is low. In less than two millennia, Earth will be transiting in front of the Sun from the viewpoint of TRAPPIST-1, making the detection of life on Earth from TRAPPIST-1 possible.

== Reception and scientific importance ==
=== Public reaction and cultural impact ===
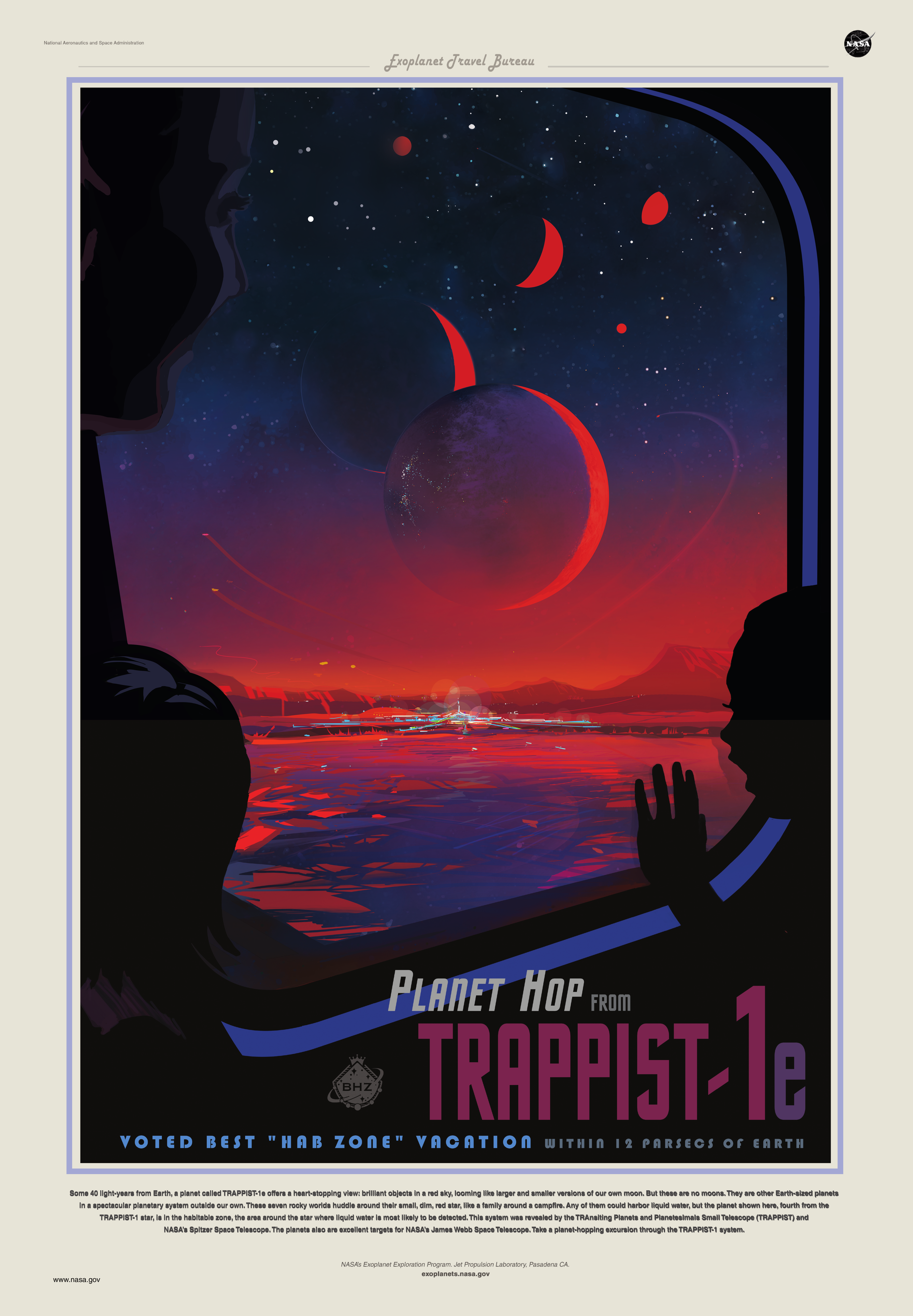
Fictional TRAPPIST-1e tourism poster made by NASA

The discovery of the TRAPPIST-1 planets drew widespread attention in major world newspapers, social media, streaming television and websites. As of 2017, the discovery of TRAPPIST-1 led to the largest single-day web traffic to the NASA website. NASA started a public campaign on Twitter to find names for the planets, which drew responses of varying seriousness, although the names of the planets will be decided by the International Astronomical Union. The dynamics of the TRAPPIST-1 planetary system have been represented as music, such as Tim Pyle's Trappist Transits, in Isolation's single Trappist-1 (A Space Anthem) and Leah Asher's piano work TRAPPIST-1. The alleged discovery of an SOS signal from TRAPPIST-1 was an April Fools prank by researchers at the High Energy Stereoscopic System in Namibia. In 2018, Aldo Spadon created a giclée (digital artwork) named "TRAPPIST-1 Planetary System as seen from Space". A website dedicated to the TRAPPIST-1 system was created under the domain name www.trappist.one.

Exoplanets are often featured in science-fiction works; books, comics and video games have featured the TRAPPIST-1 system, the earliest being The Terminator, a short story by Swiss author Laurence Suhner published in the academic journal that announced the system's discovery. At least one conference was organised to recognise works of fiction featuring TRAPPIST-1. The planets have been used as the basis of science education competitions and school projects, their surfaces portrayed in artistic imagery. Websites offering TRAPPIST-1-like planets as settings of virtual reality simulations exist, such as the "Exoplanet Travel Bureau" and the "Exoplanets Excursion"—both by NASA. Scientific accuracy has been a point of discussion both for news coverage and cultural depictions of TRAPPIST-1 planets.

=== Scientific importance ===
TRAPPIST-1 has drawn intense scientific interest and its planets are the best studied planets outside of the solar system. Its planets are the most easily studied exoplanets within their star's habitable zone owing to their relative closeness, the small size of their host star, and because from Earth's perspective they frequently pass in front of their host star. Future observations with space-based observatories and ground-based facilities may allow further insights into their properties such as density, atmospheres and biosignatures. (Note: Biosignatures are properties of a planet that can be detected from far away and which suggest the existence of life, such as atmospheric gases that are produced by biological processes.) TRAPPIST-1 planets are considered an important observation target for the James Webb Space Telescope (Note: As of 2017 they were among the smallest planets known where JWST would be able to detect atmospheres. It is possible the JWST may not have time to reliably detect certain biosignatures such as methane and ozone.) and other telescopes under construction; JWST began investigating the TRAPPIST-1 planets in 2023. Together with the discovery of Proxima Centauri b, the discovery of the TRAPPIST-1 planets and the fact that at least three of the planets are within the habitable zone has led to an increase in studies on planetary habitability. The planets are considered prototypical for the research on habitability of M dwarfs and drew scientific attention to the potential of M dwarf planets in habitability studies. The star has been the subject of detailed studies of its various aspects including the possible effects of vegetation on its planets; the possibility of detecting oceans on its planets using starlight reflected off their surfaces; possible efforts to terraform its planets; and difficulties any inhabitants of the planets would encounter with discovering certain laws of physics (general relativity, Kepler's laws and the law of gravitation) and with interstellar travel.

The role EU funding played in the discovery of TRAPPIST-1 has been cited as an example of the importance of EU projects, and the involvement of a Moroccan observatory and a Saudi Arabian university as an indication of the Islamic and Arab world's role in science. The original discoverers were affiliated with universities spanning Africa, Europe and North America, and the discovery of TRAPPIST-1 is considered to be an example of the importance of co-operation between observatories. It is also one of the major astronomical discoveries from Chilean observatories.

=== Exploration ===
TRAPPIST-1 is too distant from Earth to be reached by humans with current or expected technology. Spacecraft mission designs using present-day rockets and gravity assists would need hundreds of millennia to reach TRAPPIST-1; even a theoretical interstellar probe travelling at near the speed of light would need well over 40 years to reach the star. The speculative Breakthrough Starshot proposal for sending small, laser-accelerated, uncrewed probes would require around two hundred years to reach TRAPPIST-1.

== See also ==
- HD 10180, a star with at least six known planets and three exoplanet candidates
- HD 110067, star with six known planets all orbiting in a rhythmic resonance
- TOI-178, star with six known planets with five of them orbiting in resonance
- TOI-1136, another star with six known planets all orbiting in resonance
- LHS 1140, another star with a planetary system suitable for atmospheric studies
- List of multiplanetary systems
- List of potentially habitable exoplanets
- LP 890-9, another cool star with a planetary system
- Tabby's Star, another star with notable transit data
