= TRAPPIST-1h =

Small Earth-sized exoplanet orbiting TRAPPIST-1

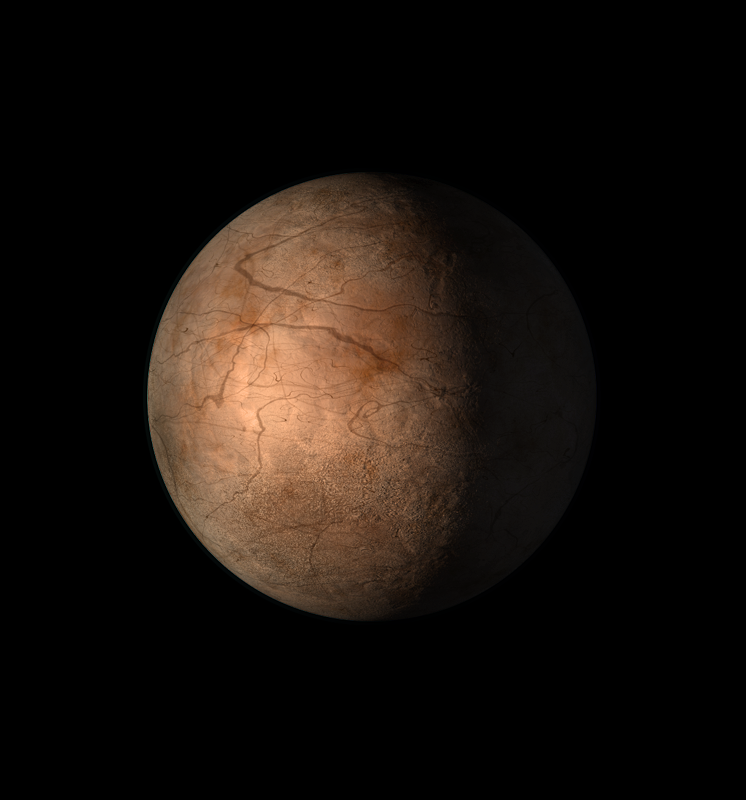
- Artist's impression of TRAPPIST-1h

Discovery
- Discovered by: Michaël Gillon et al.
- Discovery site: Spitzer Space Telescope
- Discovery date: 22 February 2017
- Detection method: Transit

Orbital characteristics
- Semi-major axis: 0.06189±0.00053 AU
- Eccentricity: 0.00567±0.00121
- Orbital period (sidereal): 18.772866±0.000214 d
- Inclination: 89.805°±0.013°
- Argument of periastron: 338.92°±9.66°
- Star: TRAPPIST-1

Physical characteristics
- Mean radius: 0.755±0.014 R_{🜨}
- Mass: 0.326±0.020 M_{🜨}
- Mean density: 4.147+0.322 −0.302 g/cm^{3}
- Surface gravity: 0.570±0.038 g 5.58±0.37 m/s^{2}
- Temperature: T_{eq}: 171.7±1.7 K (−101.5 °C; −150.6 °F)

TRAPPIST-1h is an exoplanet orbiting around the ultra-cool red dwarf star TRAPPIST-1, located 40.7 light-years (12.5 parsecs) away from Earth in the constellation Aquarius. The planet was one of seven planets to be discovered orbiting the star in 2017 using observations from the Spitzer Space Telescope. In the following years, more studies were able to refine its physical parameters.

The outermost known planet in its system, it is roughly one third the mass of Earth, and about 76% as large. Its relatively low density indicates that it is likely water-rich, like several other planets in the system.

== Physical characteristics ==
=== Mass, radius, and temperature ===
TRAPPIST-1h has a radius of 0.755 R_{🜨}, a mass of 0.326 M_{🜨}, and about 57% Earth's surface gravity. It was initially estimated to have a density of 3.97 g/cm^{3}, similar to that of Mars. Given this density, about ≤5% of its mass may be water, likely in the form of a thick ice shell, since it only receives about 13% of the stellar flux that Earth does. It has an equilibrium temperature of 169 K (−104 °C; −155 °F), similar to that of Earth's south pole.

=== Host star ===
TRAPPIST-1h orbits the ultracool dwarf star TRAPPIST-1. It is 0.12 R_{☉} and 0.09 M_{☉}, with a temperature of 2,566 K (2,293 °C; 4,159 °F) and an age of about 7.6 billion years old. For comparison, the Sun has a temperature of 5,778 K and is about 4.6 billion years old. TRAPPIST-1 is also very dim, with about 0.0005 times (0.05%) the luminosity of the Sun. The star's apparent magnitude, or how bright it appears from Earth's perspective, is 18.8. Therefore, it is too dim to be seen with the naked eye.

=== Orbit ===
Despite it being the most distant known planet in its system, TRAPPIST-1h orbits its host star with an orbital period of about 18.77 days and an orbital distance of about 0.0619 AU (9.28 million km; 5.76 million mi). This is even smaller than Mercury's orbit around the Sun (which is about 0.38 AU). It is in 3:2 resonance with TRAPPIST-1g.

=== Stable liquid water ===
Although TRAPPIST-1h's orbit falls near its star's frost line, it could harbor liquid water under an H_{2}-rich atmosphere, either primordial or resulting from continuous outgassing combined with internal heating, although existence of such atmosphere was strongly disfavored by observations in 2021 and 2022. If ice-covered, it could also potentially harbor a subsurface ocean by way of tidal heating, which could lead to cryovolcanism in the form of erupting geysers.

== See also ==
- List of transiting exoplanets
