= Ultra-cool dwarf =

Class-M stars with a temperature below 2,700 K

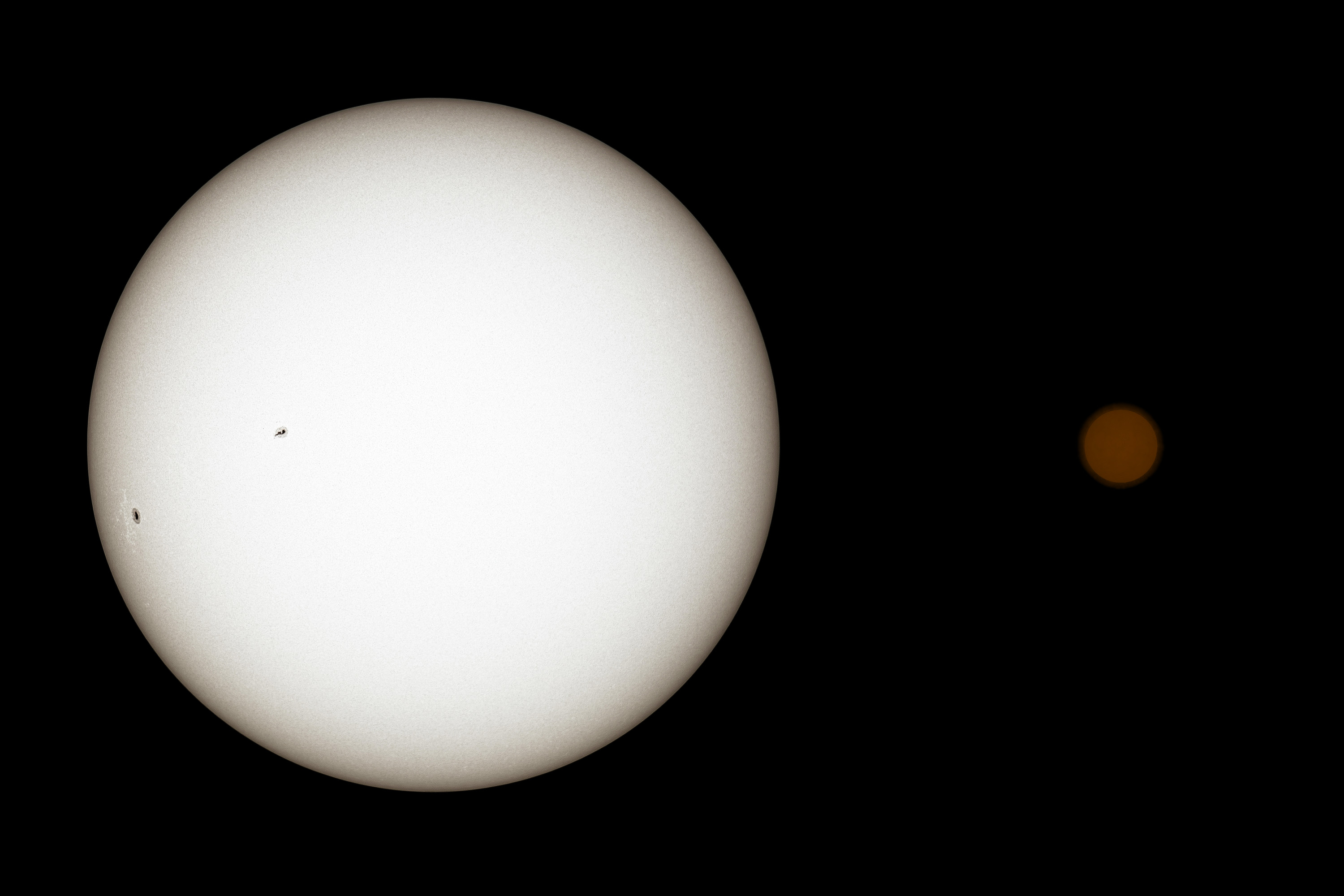
Size comparison of the Sun (left) and TRAPPIST-1 (an ultra-cool dwarf)

An ultra-cool dwarf is a stellar or substellar object that has an effective temperature lower than 2,700 K (2,430 °C; 4,400 °F). This category of dwarf stars was introduced in 1997 by J. Davy Kirkpatrick, Todd J. Henry, and Michael J. Irwin. It originally included very low mass M-dwarf stars with spectral types of M7 but was later expanded to encompass stars ranging from the coldest known to brown dwarfs as cool as spectral type T6.5. Altogether, ultra-cool dwarfs represent about 15% of the astronomical objects in the stellar neighborhood of the Sun. One of the best known examples is TRAPPIST-1.

Models of the formation of planets suggest that due to their low masses and the small size of their proto-planetary disks, these stars could host a relatively abundant population of terrestrial planets ranging from Mercury-sized to Earth-sized bodies, rather than a population of super-Earths and Jupiter-massed planets. The discovery of the TRAPPIST-1 planetary system, consisting of seven Earth-sized planets, would appear to validate this accretion model.

Due to their slow hydrogen fusion, when compared to other types of low-mass stars the life spans of ultra-cool dwarfs are estimated to be at least several hundred billion years, with the smallest among them living for about 12 trillion years. As the age of the universe is only 13.8 billion years, all ultra-cool dwarf stars are therefore in the early portions of their life-cycles. Models predict that at the ends of their lives the smallest of these stars will become blue dwarfs rather than expanding into red giants.

== Magnetic properties ==
After the detection of bursts of radio emission from the M9 ultracool dwarf LP 944-20 in 2001, a number of astrophysicists began observation campaigns at the Arecibo Observatory and the Very Large Array to search for additional objects emitting radio waves. To date hundreds of ultra-cool dwarfs have been observed with these radio telescopes and of these stars, more than a dozen radio-emitting ultra-cool dwarfs have been identified. These surveys indicate that approximately 5-10% of ultracool dwarfs emit radio waves. These observation campaigns identified the noteworthy 2MASS J10475385+2124234, which has a temperature of 800-900 K making it the coolest known radio-emitting brown dwarf (as of 2012). 2MASS J10475385+2124234 is a T6.5 brown dwarf that retains a magnetic field with a strength greater than 1.7 kG, making it some 3000 times more intense than Earth's magnetic field. More recent observations found an even colder ultracool dwarf with radio emission, called WISEPA J062309.94-045624.6 (T8), with a temperature of around 740 K.
