= Eustachian tube dysfunction =

Disorder of the ear

- Specialty: ENT surgery
- Symptoms: Aural fullness, ears popping, pressure, a feeling the ears are clogged, crackling, ear pain, tinnitus, autophony, muffled hearing, vertigo.
- Complications: Otitis media, cholesteatoma
- Types: Dilatory, baro-challenged induced, patulous
- Causes: Common cold, influenza, allergic rhinitis, sinusitis
- Differential diagnosis: Endolymphatic hydrops, temporomandibular joint dysfunction, superior canal dehiscence syndrome, labyrinthine fistula

Eustachian tube dysfunction (ETD) is a disorder where pressure abnormalities in the middle ear result in symptoms.

== Signs and symptoms ==
Symptoms include aural fullness, ears popping, a feeling of pressure in the affected ear(s), a feeling that the affected ear(s) is clogged, crackling, ear pain, tinnitus, autophony, and muffled hearing. It can also result in vertigo and loss of balance as it can have an effect on the inner ear.

== Diagnosis ==
While Eustachian tube dysfunction can be hard to diagnose, due to the Eustachian tubes and the nasopharynx not being easily visible, usually a tympanometry is indicated, along with findings on an otoscopy. For cases of baro-challenge induced Eustachian tube dysfunction, diagnosis usually relies on the history of the patient and their reported symptoms, as otoscopy and tympanometry is sometimes normal at normal ambient pressure. Opening pressure (tubomanometry) has been proposed as a method for preoperative and intraoperative evaluation of any obstructive process within the Eustachian tube. As well, Valsalva CT scanning using advanced 64 slice or higher machines has been proposed as a way of diagnosing and localizing anatomic obstruction within the Eustachian tube.

== Types ==
Four subtypes have been described:

1. Anatomic obstruction within the proximal cartilaginous eustachian tube.
2. Dilatory Eustachian tube dysfunction: Functional, dynamic (muscle failure), or anatomical obstruction of the Eustachian tube
3. Baro-challenge induced Eustachian tube dysfunction: Eustachian tube dysfunction which generally features a normal otoscopy and normal tympanometry
4. Patulous Eustachian tube dysfunction

== Causes ==
Eustachian tube dysfunction can be caused by a number of factors. Some common causes include the flu, allergies, a cold, and sinus infections. In patients with chronic ear disease such as cholesteatoma and chronic discharge, studies showed that they have obstructive pathology at the ear side of the Eustachian tube. Given that proximity of that part of the Eustachian tube to the tympanic cavity, the site of frequent infections during childhood, it is logical to conclude that this segment of the tube experiences fibrosis and stenosis from recurrent infections. This is a possible explanation for the increased frequency of chronic ear disease in disadvantaged populations who lack access to medical care including antibiotics and tympanostomy tubes.

== Treatment ==
First-line treatment options are generally aimed at treating the underlying cause and include attempting to "pop" the ears, usually via the Valsalva maneuver, the use of oral or topical decongestants, oral steroids, oral antihistamines, and topical nasal steroid sprays, such as Flonase.

If medical management fails, myringotomy, which is a surgical procedure in which an incision is made in the eardrum to drain pus from the middle ear or to relieve pressure caused by a large buildup of fluid, is indicated, and usually accompanied by the insertion of a tympanostomy tube.

Tentative evidence supports the use of balloon dilation of the Eustachian tube. In 2018, researchers published a prospective, multicenter, randomized, controlled trial demonstrating efficacy of this technique. Dilatation of the eustachian tube using balloon catheter has gained attention as a method of treating eustachian tube obstruction. There are two methods of performing this procedure depending on the route of the catheter introduction and the area of the Eustachian tube to be dilated.
