= ETD =

ETD may refer to:

== Science and technology ==
- Eustachian tube dysfunction, a disorder of the middle ear
- Everhart–Thornley detector
- Explosives trace detector or explosive trace detection
- Eye-tracking device, an experiment on the International Space Station
- Electron-transfer dissociation
- End-of-train device

== Businesses and organizations ==
- Club of Four (French: Société Européenne de Travaux et de Développement), an alliance of French truck manufacturers
- Estuary Transit District, an American transit operator
- ICAO designator for Etihad Airways, an Emirati airline
- Exoplanet Transit Database, a database of exoplanet transit observations
- Etadunna Airstrip, IATA airport code "ETD"

== Other uses ==
- Electronic Theses and Dissertations, a term used by librarians for a class of institutional repository items
- Exchange-traded derivative contract, a financial instrument
- Spyro: Enter the Dragonfly, a 2002 platform video game
- Estimated time of departure
