= Petr Heinzel =

Czech astronomist and university educator

Prof. Petr Heinzel Dr Sc
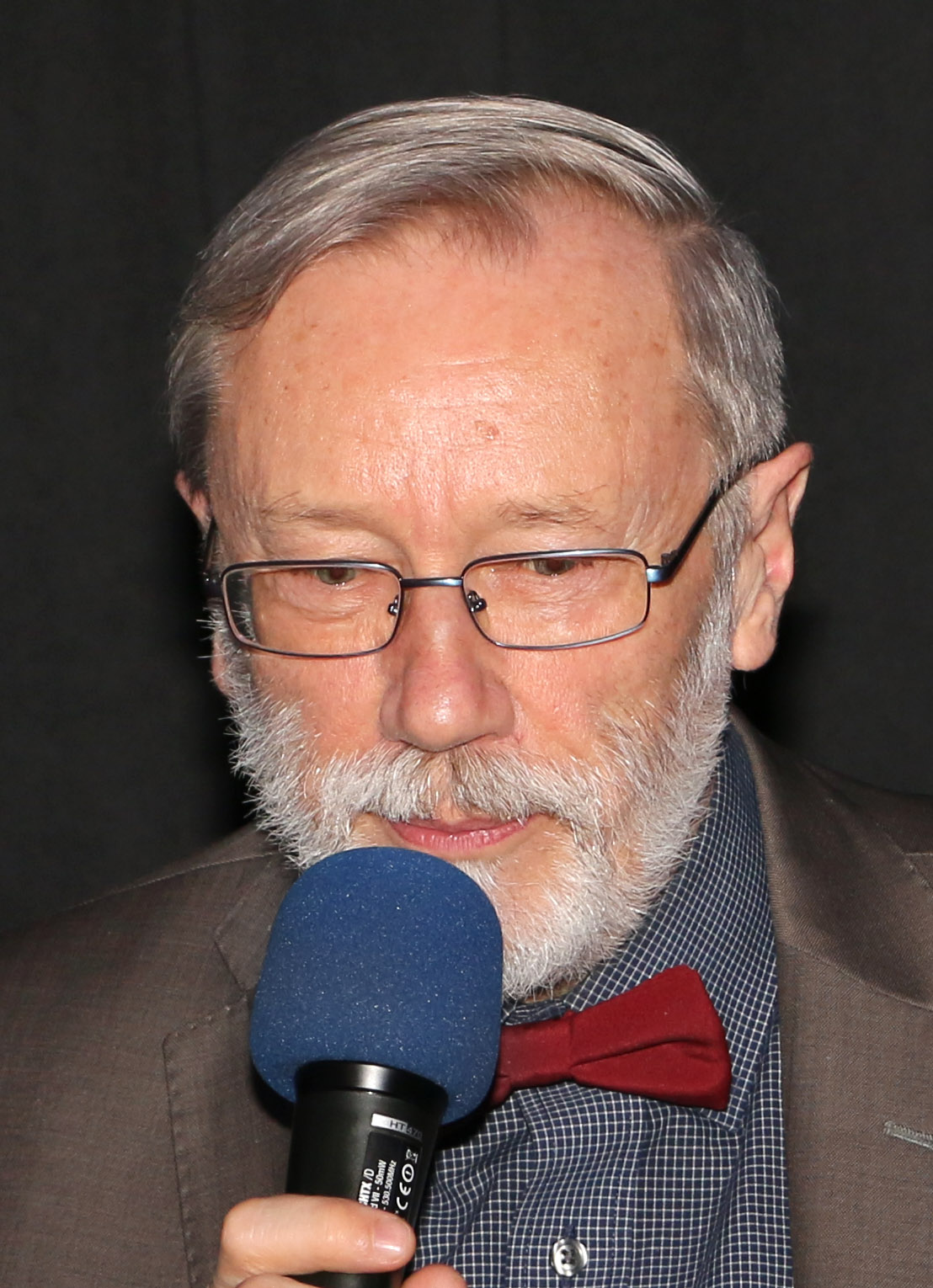
- Petr Heinzel in 2017
- Born: 9 November 1950 (age 75); Náchod, Czechoslovakia
- Occupation: Chairman of the Czech Astronomical Society (2017–)
- Awards: Nušl Prize (2014) awarded by the Czech Academy of Sciences

Academic background
- Education: Charles University, Czech Republic

Academic work
- Discipline: Astrophysics
- Sub-discipline: Solar physics
- Main interests: Stellar atmospheres, radiation hydrodynamics, solar flares
- Notable works: Solar and Stellar Flares (2017)

Petr Heinzel (born 9 November 1950) is a Czech astronomer and professor who is specialized in solar physics. From 2004 to 2012, he was director of the Astronomical Institute of the Czech Academy of Sciences (AV ČR). In 2012 he was appointed Professor of Astronomy and Astrophysics at Charles University, Czech Republic. Since 2017, he is chair of the Czech Astronomical Society. He is also a member of the International Astronomical Union.

== Personal life ==
Heinzel was born on 9 November 1950 in Náchod.

His hobby is classical music. He plays the violin and performs with other astronomers at the Ondřejov Observatory and at national or international astronomical events in the Czech Republic.

== Academic background ==
Petr Heinzel graduated in 1974 from the Faculty of Mathematics and Physics of Charles University in Prague. In 1982, he received a PhD in Astrophysics and in 1993 became Doctor of Science in Astrophysics.

== Research field ==
Petr Heinzel's area of research is Solar physics. He has conducted research on solar flares, solar prominences, coronal loops, chromosphere structure and radiative transfer in stellar atmospheres. He has achieved significant scientific contributions in radiation hydrodynamics of stellar atmospheres, as well as in the spectral analysis of astrophysical plasma

== Academic and scientific career ==
He started working at the Astronomical Institute of AV ČR at Ondřejov after graduating in 1974. There he became the head of the solar department, a position he held until 2004.

From 1987 to 1995, he was associate scientist in the SOHO/SUMER team, that developed a VUV telescope and spectrometer (project SUMER, for Solar Ultraviolet Measurements of Emitted Radiation) at the Max Planck Institute for Solar System Research in Lindau, Germany, to operate on board of the ESA/NASA spacecraft Solar and Heliospheric Observatory (SOHO), which was launched in December 1995

In July 2004, Petr Heinzel became director of the Astronomical Institute of AV ČR. He kept his position in 2007, when the institute was transformed into a public research institution, and remained in office until 2012.

In 2012, Petr Heinzel was appointed Professor of Astronomy and Astrophysics at the Department of Astronomy, Faculty of Mathematics and Physics, Charles University. He had been Associate Professor since 2005.

On 2 April 2017, Petr Heinzel was elected Chair of the Czech Astronomical Society.

== Teacher occupations ==
Petr Heinzel teaches stellar atmospheres theory and solar physics at Charles University. Abroad, he is an external lecturer at Comenius University in Bratislava, Slovakia and at the University of Wrocław, Poland.

He has been a member of the Supervisory Board for PhD students at Charles University, and a supervisor of PhD students at Charles University, Comenius University, the University of Wrocław, Moscow State University and Cairo University.

He has also been a visiting professor at the Université de Paris (Orsay), Observatoire de Meudon, France, at the University of Wrocław, Poland and at the Max Planck Institute for Astrophysics in Garching, Germany.

== Awards ==
In 2003, Petr Heinzel received an award from the Czech Academy of Sciences for the analysis of spectral data of hydrogen of the solar atmosphere obtained by the Solar and Heliospheric Observatory (SOHO).

In 2009, he received the Gold Medal of the University of Wrocław for long-term cooperation and in recognition of his scientific results.

Petr Heinzel was laureate for 2014 of the Nušl Prize awarded by the Czech Academy of Sciences. The award was presented by the Chairman of the Czech Astronomical Society of the time Jan Vondrak, Dr Sc.

== Publications ==
=== Scientific papers ===
Since 1975, Petr Heinzel has published more than 130 scientific papers, which have received more than 2,000 citations. His Hirsch index has reached 40.

=== Books ===
Petr Heinzel coauthored multiple books discussing solar physics:

- Solar Coronal Structures (1994, coauthored with V. Rušin and J.-C. Vial)
- The Physics of Chromospheric Plasmas (2007, Astronomical Society of the pacific, coauthored with I. Dorotovič and R. J. Rutten)
- Solar and Stellar Flares and Their Effects on Planets (2016, Cambridge University Press, coauthored with A. Kosovichev and S. Hawley)
- Solar and Stellar Flares (2017, Springer Netherlands, coauthored with Lyndsay Fletcher)
