= SPECULOOS-3 b =

Exoplanet orbiting SPECULOOS-3

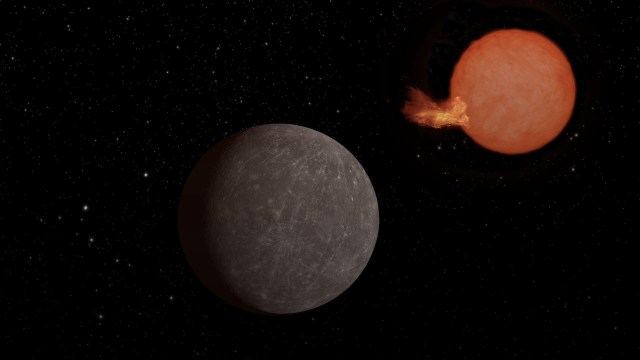
- Artist's impression of SPECULOOS-3 b and its host star, a red dwarf much cooler, dimmer than smaller than the Sun.

Discovery
- Discovered by: Michael Gillon et al.
- Discovery site: SPECULOOS
- Discovery date: May 15, 2024
- Detection method: Transit method

Designations
- Named after: SPECULOOS

Orbital characteristics
- Semi-major axis: 0.00733 AU
- Orbital period (sidereal): 0.719 days (17 hours and 15 min.)
- Inclination: 89.44°±0.39°
- Star: LSPM J2049+3336 (SPECULOOS-3)

Physical characteristics
- Mean radius: 0.977±0.02 R_{🜨} 0.07273 R_{J}
- Mass: 0.894 M_{🜨} (estimate)
- Temperature: 553±8 K (280±8 °C)

SPECULOOS-3 b is an Earth-sized exoplanet, orbiting the ultra-cool red dwarf star SPECULOOS-3. It is relatively close to Earth, at a distance of 55 light-years. SPECULOOS-3 b takes only about 17 hours to complete an orbit around SPECULOOS-3, and, because of that proximity, it receives very high levels of radiation and is tidally locked, meaning that one side of the planet always faces its host star. Its discovery was made using the SPECULOOS project, and announced in May 2024 in the academic journal Nature Astronomy.

The host star of SPECULOOS-3 b is SPECULOOS-3 (LSPM J2049+3336, TIC 230741378), an ultra-cool red dwarf star in the constellation Cygnus, with just one tenth of the Sun's mass, 13% of the size and 0.09% of its luminosity.

== Characteristics ==
The planet's radius, as deduced from its transit depth, is 0.98 R_{🜨}, making it similar to Earth in size. The mass of SPECULOOS-3b has been not measured, but the NASA Exoplanet Catalog estimated it at 0.894 M_{🜨} (although the NASA Exoplanet Catalog seems to erroneously claim the system to be 22,152 lightyears away, which is incorrect). Measuring the planet's mass is essential to determining if it is rocky and to further contrain its composition.

It orbits relatively close to its host star: one year on SPECULOOS-3 b is equivalent to about 17 hours in Earth. The semi-major axis is equivalent to 0.7% of an astronomical unit. As a consequence, the planet receives high levels of radiation from its host star, and its planetary equilibrium temperature is estimated at 280 °C (almost as warm as Venus) assuming a null bond albedo, meaning that its dayside is likely made of solid rock. It is also tidally locked to SPECULOOS-3, meaning that one side of the planet is always facing the star, while the other side is always facing away.

Due to the planet's high temperature and its host star's infrared brightness, its dayside's astronomic spectrum (of emission) might be measured by the MIRI/RLS instrument aboard the James Webb Space Telescope. Such observations should reveal the presence of an atmosphere around the planet, or constrain its mineralogical surface, if no atmosphere is detected.

== Discovery ==
The discovery of SPECULOOS-3 b was made using the SPECULOOS project, led by the University of Liège, in Belgium, in collaboration with other universities across different countries. SPECULOOS consists of a network of telescopes in search of faint stars and exoplanets around them. The planet was discovered using the observatory in the Atacama Desert, Chile.

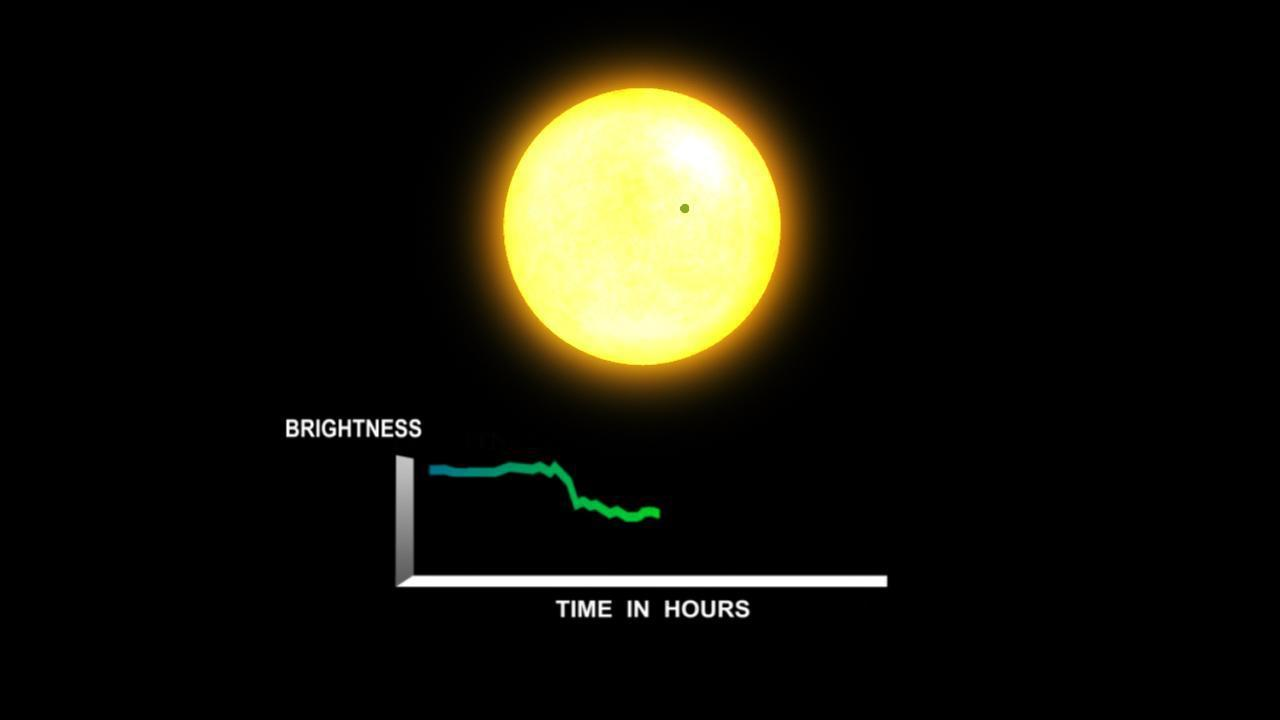
Transit method

The planet was detected using the transit method. The host star SPECULOOS-3 was observed by the SAINT-EX telescope in 2021, for five nights, producing two light curves containing planetary transits. The star was later reviewed by the SPECULOOS-North observatory's Artemis telescope, revealing a clear transit-like signature on its light curve. Subsequent observations with the SAINT-EX and SPECULOOS-South telescopes revealed more planetary transits, which were associated with an Earth-like exoplanet transiting the star with an orbital period of 0.719 days. SPECULOOS-3 b's discovery was announced in May 2024, in the journal Nature Astronomy.

== Host star ==
LSPM J2049+3336, also known as SPECULOOS-3, is a red dwarf star (spectral type M6.5), 16.75 parsecs (54.6 ly) away in the constellation Cygnus. (Note: Obtained with right ascension and declination placed on this website.) It is one of the smallest known stars, and is much cooler, dimmer and smaller than the Sun, having 0.1 times the mass, 0.08% the Sun's luminosity, and an effective temperature of 2,800 K (2,530 °C), which is less than half the Sun's temperature (5,772 K). Its small radius of 0.12 R_{☉} make it the second-smallest star with a transiting planet, with only TRAPPIST-1 being smaller.

Red dwarf stars such as SPECULOOS-3 are the most numerous type of stars, making up 70% of all stars in the Milky Way galaxy. They are expected to live 10 times longer than the Sun, with lifespans exceeding 100 billion years.
