= Michaël Gillon =

Belgian astronomer and astrophysicist

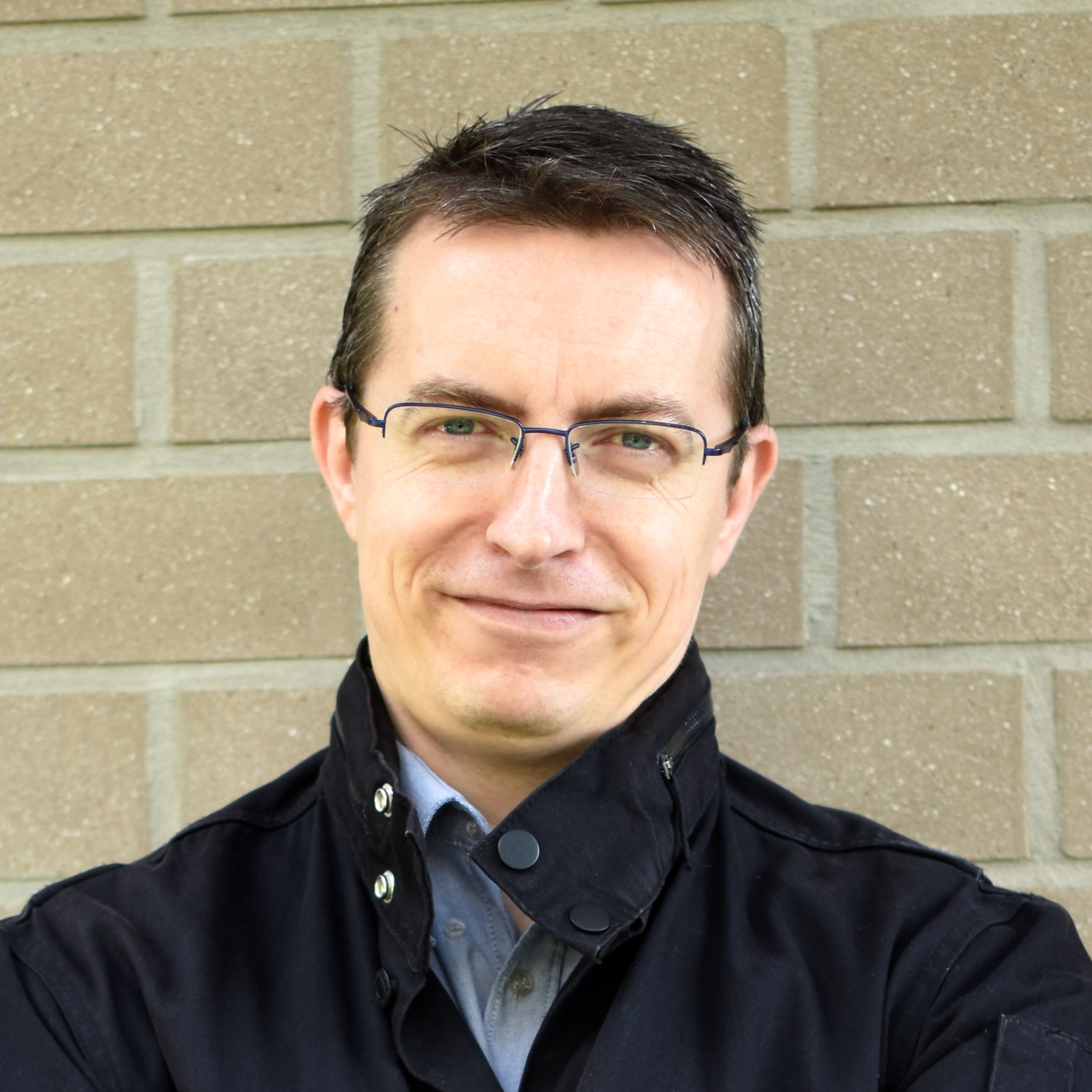
- Born: 1974 (age 51–52); Liège
- Education: University of Liège
- Known for: TRAPPIST-1
- Scientific career
- Fields: Astronomy
- Workplaces: University of Liège
- Website: www.speculoos.uliege.be; www.exotic.uliege.be

Michaël Gillon (born 1974) is a Belgian astronomer and astrophysicist. His research focuses on exoplanets and he conducts his research at the University of Liège. He holds a master's degree in biochemistry and astrophysics and also a PhD in astrophysics, and completed his post-doctorate at Geneva Observatory. Co-discoverer of hundreds of exoplanets, he is FNRS Research Director at the Institute of Astrophysics and Geophysics of the Department of Astrophysics, Geophysics and Oceanography, and co-director of the Astrobiology Research Unit of the University of Liège (Belgium). Michaël Gillon is at the origin of the discovery of the TRAPPIST-1 exoplanetary system.

== Biography ==
Michaël Gillon began his higher education at the age of twenty-four, after seven years of service in the Belgian army. "I finished high school at the age of seventeen, and I didn't feel ready - or motivated - to undertake [higher] education," he says. "Afterwards, I regretted it." He enrolled at the University of Liège and, in five years, obtained a degree in biochemistry and an undergraduate degree in physics. He was attracted to research and, at the end, was able to pursue a career as a researcher.

Attracted by research, he became a doctoral student in astrophysics in 2003, after hesitating between genetics and biochemistry. In March 2006, he defended his PhD thesis on the improvement of the photometry of exoplanet transits in the framework of the CoRoT project. He then left the University of Liege for a postdoctoral stay of almost three years at the observatory of the University of Geneva. During this stay, he led the detection of the transits of the Neptune-sized exoplanet Gliese 436b, and participated in the discovery of several hot Jupiters as WASP-18 b.

Back to the University of Liege in January 2009, he continues his work on the detection of exoplanets and their physicochemical characterization. In the framework of the TRAPPIST project, he is scientific leader and principal investigator for exoplanets. This project led to numerous publications and the detection of >200 transiting exoplanets between late 2010 and early 2026. He initiated an international research observing for the first time the thermal emission of a super-Earth: 55 Cancri e.

In 2012, he initiated the SPECULOOS project, a search for transiting terrestrial planets around the nearest ultracool dwarf stars and brown dwarfs using a network of robotic 1m-class telescopes. This project is ongoing since 2019.

In 2013, he was appointed member of the CHEOPS scientific team. He represents Belgium there with his colleague Valerie Van Grootel.

On February 22, 2017, NASA officially announced the discovery of seven exoplanets by an international team of astronomers, led by Michaël Gillon. These exoplanets, named TRAPPIST-1 b, c, d, e, f, g, h, were detected using the European Southern Observatory's TRAPPIST telescope. These seven exoplanets, located at 39 light-years from the Sun, orbit the dwarf star TRAPPIST-1. Three of these exoplanets had already been discovered in 2015 by an international team led by Gillon and using the TRAPPIST telescope, but the collaboration with NASA has expanded those discoveries.

== Awards ==
- Chevalier du mérite Wallon (Knight of Walloon Merit) September 15, 2016
- Ranked in the 2017 edition of Time magazine's list of the 100 most influential people.
- September 11, 2017, he is awarded the Balzan Prize, endowed with 750,000 Swiss francs (about 650,000 euros), by the eponymous Italian-Swiss foundation for his search for planets around nearby stars, considered "an important step on the path to discovering signs of life outside our solar system." The prize will be officially presented to him in Bern on November 17, 2017 by Doris Leuthard, the President of the Swiss Confederation.
- In 2021 he is awarded the Francqui Prize (in Exact Sciences) for his pioneering research in exoplanetology and astrobiology that led, among other things, to the discovery of the TRAPPIST-1 exoplanetary system.
