= Alice L. Walton School of Medicine =

Private medical school in Bentonville, Arkansas, United States

Coordinates: 36.3827°N 94.1981°W

- Established: 2021
- Founders: Alice Walton
- Accreditation: Preliminary accreditation from Liaison Committee on Medical Education
- Chairman: Lloyd Minor
- Dean: Sharmila Makhija
- Location: Bentonville, Arkansas, Arkansas, United States
- Campus: 14 acres
- Website: www.alwmedschool.org

Alice L. Walton School of Medicine (stylized as AWSOM) is a medical school in Bentonville, Arkansas, United States, that offers four-year medical degrees. It was founded by Alice Walton in 2021 and is the second medical school in Arkansas.

== Overview ==
Alice L. Walton School of Medicine (AWSOM) is a four-year medical degree program in Bentonville, Arkansas. The program is for medical doctorates and it is the second medical school in the state of Arkansas. It was founded and funded by Alice Walton.

The school teaches its medical students in the traditional model and also focuses on physical, emotional and mental health with an emphasis on preventative care and healthy lifestyles called a "whole-health" approach.

== History ==
The medical school was founded in 2021 as Whole Health School of Medicine and Health Sciences. In 2022, it was renamed Alice L. Walton School of Medicine. Sharmila Makhija was announced as the founding dean and chief executive officer in February 2023. A month later, AWSOM broke ground on 14-acres of land for its medical education facility. Yolangel Hernandez Suarez was appointed Executive Vice Dean in August 2024.

Alice L. Walton Foundation, Mercy, and Heartland Whole Health Institute announced on September 24, 2024, a 30-year, $700 million agreement under which Mercy will serve as the primary educational partner for AWSOM. The following month, AWSOM was given preliminary accreditation status from the Liaison Committee on Medical Education, allowing the school to begin recruiting students. Following preliminary accreditation, the school began accepting student applications. The first five cohorts of students will have their tuition fees waived.

The school and Stanford Medicine co-hosted the inaugural conference “Think Health" at Crystal Bridges Museum in January 2025. The first week of classes were held in July 2025 with a white coat ceremony for the 48 student large inaugural class. The school received over 2,000 applications and of the students selected, one-third were from Arkansas and 20 percent from bordering states.

== Operations ==
Sharmila Makhija is the founding Dean and Chief Executive Officer. Yolangel Hernandez Suarez is Executive Vice Dean. There are over 50 faculty members.

Board members include:

- Founder Alice Walton
- Chair Lloyd Minor, Stanford Medicine
- Valerie Montgomery Rice, Morehouse School of Medicine
- Marc A. Nivet, University of Texas, Southwestern Medical Center
- Todd Simmons from Simmons Foods
- James B. Young, Cleveland Clinic
- Katherine Knutson, Author Health
- Cheryl Pegus, FlyteHealth
- Scott D. Hambuchen from First Orion Corp.

=== Facilities ===
Polk Stanley Wilcox Architects was the lead architect for the school's facility and Office of Strategy and Design (OSD) was the lead designer for the school’s landscape and rooftop park. The school is a four-story, 154,000-square-foot building. It has an amphitheater, gardens, and a 2-acre rooftop park that is open to the public.

The school is connected by trails to Crystal Bridges Museum of American Art and Heartland Whole Health Institute. A 300-unit apartment complex was announced in 2024 for students and other renters.
