= SPECULOOS-3 =

Red dwarf star in the constellation Cygnus

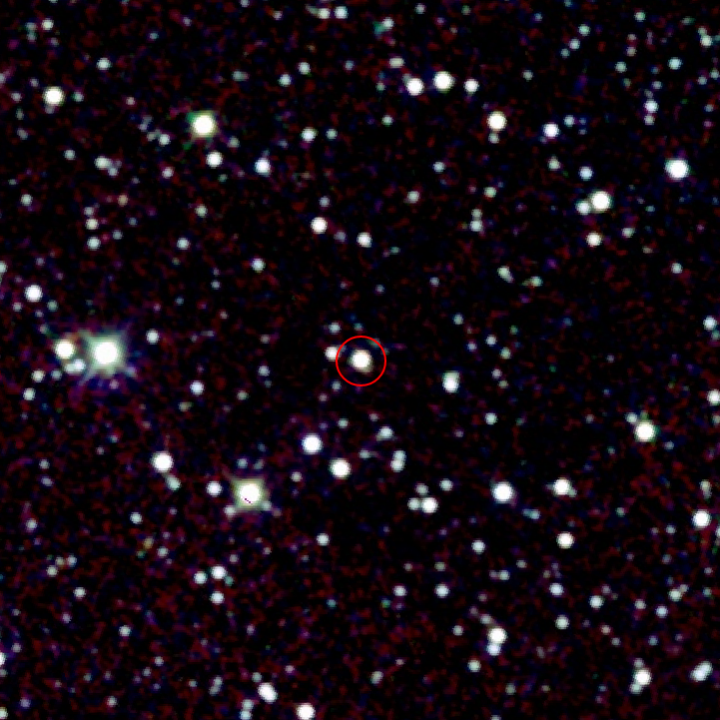
- SPECULOOS-3 (circled) as seen by 2MASS.

Observation data Epoch J2000 Equinox J2000
- Constellation: Cygnus
- Right ascension: 20^{h} 49^{m} 27.44052^{s}
- Declination: +33° 36′ 50.9686″
- Apparent magnitude (V): 17.8 (estimate)

Characteristics
- Evolutionary stage: main sequence
- Spectral type: M6.5±0.5
- Apparent magnitude (B): 19
- Apparent magnitude (R): 16.4
- Apparent magnitude (G): 15.379
- Apparent magnitude (J): 11.5
- Apparent magnitude (H): 10.867±0.021
- Apparent magnitude (K): 10.54

Astrometry
Proper motion (μ)	RA: –207.809 mas/yr Dec.: –412.215 mas/yr
Parallax (π)	59.7005±0.0434 mas
Distance	54.63 ± 0.04 ly (16.75 ± 0.01 pc)

Details
Mass	0.1009±0.0024 M_{☉}
Radius	0.123±0.0022 R_{☉}
Luminosity	0.000835±0.000019 L_{☉}
Surface gravity (log g)	5.265±0.014 cgs
Temperature	2800±29 K
Metallicity [Fe/H]	0.07±0.1 dex
Rotation	1.34±0.14 d
Rotational velocity (v sin i)	4.8±0.5 km/s
Age	6.6+1.8 −2.4 Gyr

Other designations
- LSPM J2049+3336, TIC 230741378, 2MASS J20492745+3336512, WISE J204927.26+333646.6, Gaia DR2 1869054868256849920, Gaia DR3 1869054868256849920

Database references
SIMBAD	data
Exoplanet Archive	data

SPECULOOS-3, also known as LSPM J2049+3336, is a red dwarf star (spectral type M6.5) located 54.6 light-years (16.7 parsecs) from Earth in the constellation Cygnus. It is one of the smallest known stars, and is much cooler, dimmer and smaller than the Sun, having 0.1 times the mass, 0.08% the Sun's luminosity, and an effective temperature of 2,800 K (2,530 °C), which is less than half of the Sun's temperature (5,772 K). It is orbited by one known exoplanet, and is the second ultra-cool dwarf discovered to have a planetary system, after TRAPPIST-1.

== Stellar properties ==
The age of SPECULOOS-3 is constrained at 6.6 billion years, 44% older than the Solar System, with significant margins of error. A bayesian analysis of the star derived a mass of 0.101 M_{☉}, an effective temperature of 2,800 K (2,530 °C; 4,580 °F) and a luminosity of 8.35×10^{−6} L_{☉}. These characteristics classify SPECULOOS-3 as an ultra-cool dwarf, which are stars at the end of the main sequence, with low temperatures, low luminosites and sizes similar to Jupiter. It is spinning at a rotational velocity of 4.8 km/s and has a projected rotational period of 1.34 days.

The stellar radius, computed using the Stefan–Boltzmann law, is 0.134 R_{☉} (93,000 kilometres). This makes SPECULOOS-3 the second-smallest star known to host a transiting planet, just marginally larger than TRAPPIST-1, and its size is similar to that of Jupiter. Its apparent magnitude is estimated at 17.8, which is too faint to be seen by the naked eye.

It was first discovered in 2005 as part of the LSPM-North catalog, whose objective was to map stars in the northern celestial hemisphere with proper motions larger than 0.15" per year and apparent magnitudes smaller than 21^{m}. Its trignometric parallax was first measured in 2014 at 67.5±1.7 mas, translating into a distance of 14.8 parsecs (48.27 ly). Gaia Data Release 3 (2023) published a parallax of 59.7 milliarcseconds, translating into a distance of 16.75 parsecs (54.6 ly). This make this star relatively close to Earth.

Red dwarf stars such as SPECULOOS-3 are the most numerous type of stars, making up 70% of all stars in the Milky Way galaxy. They are expected to live 10 times more than the Sun, with lifespans longer than 100 billion years.

== Planetary system ==
SPECULOOS-3 hosts one exoplanet, discovered in 2024 via the transit method. Named SPECULOOS-3 b, it is an Earth-sized exoplanet that has a radius similar to that of Earth, equivalent to 0.98 Earth radii. It takes only about 17 hours to complete an orbit around SPECULOOS-3, and, because of that proximity, it receives very high levels of radiation and is likely tidally locked, meaning that one side of the planet always faces its host star. Its discovery was made using the SPECULOOS project, and was announced on 15 May 2024 in the academic journal Nature Astronomy.

The mass of SPECULOOS-3 b has been not measured, but it has been estimated by NASA's Eyes on Exoplanets at 0.894 M_{🜨}. Its equilibrium temperature is about 553 K (280 °C; 536 °F), meaning that its dayside is likely formed by solid rock. The planet is an optimal target for characterization with the James Webb Space Telescope, giving more information about the planet's mineralogy and the possibility of hosting an atmosphere.

The SPECULOOS-3 planetary system
Companion (in order from star)	Mass	Semimajor axis (AU)	Orbital period (days)	Eccentricity	Inclination (°)	Radius
b	—	0.007330(55)	0.71912603(57)	—	89.44±0.39	0.977±0.022 R_{🜨}
