= Tullio phenomenon =

Sound-induced vertigo

Tullio phenomenon, sound-induced vertigo, dizziness, nausea or eye movement (nystagmus) was first described in 1929 by the Italian biologist Prof. Pietro Tullio. (San Vito al Tagliamento, 1881 – Genova, 1941) During his experiments on pigeons, Tullio discovered that by drilling tiny holes in the semicircular canals of his subjects, he could subsequently cause them balance problems when exposed to sound.

The cause is usually a fistula in the middle or inner ear, allowing abnormal sound-synchronized pressure changes in the balance organs. Such an opening may be caused by a barotrauma (e.g. incurred when diving or flying), or may be a side effect of fenestration surgery, syphilis or Lyme disease. Patients with this disorder may also experience vertigo, imbalance and eye movement set off by changes in pressure, e.g. when nose-blowing, swallowing or when lifting heavy objects.

Tullio phenomenon is also one of the common symptoms of superior canal dehiscence syndrome (SCDS), first diagnosed in 1998 by Dr. Lloyd B. Minor, Johns Hopkins University, Baltimore, United States.
