= Vestibular evoked myogenic potential =

The vestibular evoked myogenic potential (VEMP; not to be confused with VsEP) is a neurophysiological assessment technique used to determine the function of the otolithic organs (utricle and saccule) of the inner ear. It complements the information provided by caloric testing and other forms of inner ear (vestibular apparatus) testing. There are two different types of VEMPs. One is the oVEMP and another is the cVEMP. The oVEMP measures integrity of the utricule and superior vestibular nerve and the cVEMP measures the saccule and the inferior vestibular nerve.

== The vestibular system ==
The vestibular system helps a person maintain: balance, visual fixation, posture, and lower muscular control.

There are six receptor organs located in the inner ear: cochlea, utricle, saccule, and the lateral, anterior, and posterior semicircular canals. The cochlea is a sensory organ with the primary purpose to aid in hearing. The otolith organs (utricle and saccule) are sensors for detecting linear acceleration in their respective planes (utrical=horizontal plane (forward/backward; up/down); saccule=sagital plane (up/down)), and the three semicircular canals (anterior/superior, posterior, and horizontal) detect head rotation or angular acceleration in their respective planes of orientation (anterior/superior=pitch (nodding head), posterior=roll (moving head from one shoulder to other), and horizontal=yaw (shaking head left to right).

Located within the membranous labyrinthine walls of the vestibular system are approximately 67,000 hair cells in total. This includes ~7,000 hair cells from each of the semicircular canals located within the crista ampullaris, ~30,000 hair cells from the utricle, and ~16,000 hair cells from the saccule. Each hair cell has about 70 stereocilia (short rod-like hair cells) and one kinocilium (long hair cell).

== History ==
Bickford et al. (1964) and subsequently Townsend and Cody, provided evidence for a short latency response in posterior neck muscles in response to loud clicks that appeared to be mediated by activation of the vestibular apparatus. These authors made the additional important observations that the response was generated from EMG (muscle) activity and that it scaled with the level of tonic activation. Subsequent work led to the suggestion that the saccule was the end organ excited.

In 1992 Colebatch and Halmagyi reported a patient with a short latency response to loud clicks studied using a modified recording site (the sternocleidomastoid muscles: SCM) and which was abolished by selective vestibular nerve section. Colebatch et al. (1994) described the basic properties of the response. These were: the response occurred ipsilateral to the ear stimulated, the click threshold was high, the response did not depend upon hearing (cochlear function) per se, it scaled in direct proportion to the level of tonic neck contraction, the response was small (although large compared to many evoked potentials) and required averaging, and only the initial positive-negative response (p13-n23 by latency) was actually vestibular-dependent. It was subsequently shown to be generated by a brief period of inhibition of motor unit discharge.

== VsEPA and VSEPL ==
Vestibular sensory evoked potential (VsEP) assesses the non-auditory portions of the labyrinth and requires kinematic stimuli (i.e. motion) instead of sound stimuli and bear only a loose relationship to VEMPs. This kinematic stimuli needs to be well characterized, precisely controlled, consistent in amplitude, and consistent in kinematic makeup. An electromechanical shaker is a stimuli generator that is widely available. This shaker provides a transient stimuli, can generate angular or linear acceleration, and can couple to the skull directly (with skull screws) or via a stimulus platform.

The VsEP is commonly divided into two sections: angular vestibular evoked potentials (VsEPA) and linear vestibular evoked potentials (VsEPL).

=== VsEPA ===
VsEPA stimuli needs to be a brief or transient, high amplitude, angular acceleration pulse. Currently, the most effective stimuli for the best results have not yet been identified or agreed upon by researchers. The major downfall of the VsEPA response is that it also elicits a VsEPL response.

=== VsEPL ===
In contrast to VsEPA, researchers have standardized the VsEPL stimuli but many variants of this standard are being used in research laboratories today. The stimulus needs to be a transient, rapidly changing pulse (i.e. linear jerk stimulus). A rectangular jerk step/pulse is generated by an electromechanical shaker. The main downfall of the VsEPL response is the presence of electrical artifacts due to movement and touching of the wires/electrodes during testing.

== Application of VEMPs ==
An early application was in the diagnosis of superior canal dehiscence a condition in which there can be clinical symptoms and signs of vestibular activation by loud sounds. Such cases have a pathologically lowered threshold for the sound-evoked VEMP. The test is also of use in demonstrating successful treatment. It has diagnostic applications in Ménière's disease, vestibular neuritis, otosclerosis as well as central disorders such as multiple sclerosis.

Other methods of activating the vestibular apparatus have been developed, including taps to the head, bone vibration and short duration electrical stimulation. It is likely that both air-conducted and bone-conducted stimuli primarily excite irregularly discharging otolith afferents. The two otolith receptors appear to have differing resonances that may also explain their responses.

In addition to the response in the SCM, similar reflexes can be shown for the masseter and for eye muscles (oVEMPs or OVEMPs = ocular vestibular evoked myogenic potentials).

== See also ==
- Vestibular system
- Electrophysiology
- Evoked potential
- Auditory evoked potential
- Visual evoked potential
- Auditory brainstem response
