= LP 890-9 =

Red dwarf star in the constellation Eridanus

Observation data Epoch J2000 Equinox ICRS
- Constellation: Eridanus
- Right ascension: 04^{h} 16^{m} 31.16176^{s}
- Declination: −28° 18′ 52.9543″
- Apparent magnitude (V): 18.0±0.2

Characteristics
- Evolutionary stage: Main sequence
- Spectral type: M6V
- Apparent magnitude (V): 18.0±0.2
- Apparent magnitude (G): 15.791±0.003
- Apparent magnitude (J): 12.258±0.023
- Apparent magnitude (H): 11.692±0.025
- Apparent magnitude (K): 11.344±0.023

Astrometry
Radial velocity (R_{v})	28.84±2.84 km/s
Proper motion (μ)	RA: 218.569 mas/yr Dec.: −251.145 mas/yr
Parallax (π)	30.9326±0.0418 mas
Distance	105.4 ± 0.1 ly (32.33 ± 0.04 pc)
Absolute magnitude (M_{V})	15.45±0.2 (Note: The absolute magnitude M_{V} of the star can be calculated from its apparent magnitude m_{V} and distance d using the following equation: $\scriptstyle M_V = m_V - 5\log_{10} \left(\frac{d}{10\mathrm{\ parsecs}}\right)$)

Details
Mass	0.118±0.002 M_{☉}
Radius	0.1532+0.0048 −0.0024 R_{☉}
Luminosity (bolometric)	0.001438±0.000037 L_{☉}
Surface gravity (log g)	5.139+0.013 −0.028 cgs
Temperature	2871+32 −45 K
Metallicity [Fe/H]	−0.028±0.089 dex
Age	7.2+2.2 −3.1 Gyr

Other designations
- SPECULOOS-2, LP 890-9, NLTT 12925, TOI-4306, TIC 44898913, 2MASS J04163114-2818526, WISEA J041631.33-281855.5

Database references
SIMBAD	data
Exoplanet Archive	data

LP 890-9 (also known as SPECULOOS-2 or TOI-4306) is a red dwarf star located 105 light-years (32 pc) away from the Solar System in the constellation of Eridanus. The star has 12% the mass and 15% the radius of the Sun, and a temperature of 2,871 K (2,598 °C; 4,708 °F). It is extremely faint and, with an apparent magnitude of 18, is the faintest star with exoplanets discovered by the Transiting Exoplanet Survey Satellite (TESS).

== Planetary system ==
In 2022, two exoplanets were discovered in orbit around this star. The first planet, LP 890-9 b, was initially identified using TESS. Further observations using SPECULOOS confirmed this planet and discovered a second planet, LP 890-9 c. Both planets are likely terrestrial planets, somewhat larger than Earth. The outer planet LP 890-9 c orbits within the habitable zone, and is a favorable target for atmospheric characterization using JWST. A 2026 study found evidence for a possible third planet, LP 890-9 d, via transit-timing variations. This would be a sub-Earth-sized planet that likely orbits between planets b & c.

LP 890-9 c orbits near the inner edge of the conservative habitable zone, and models differ as to whether the planet is more likely to resemble Earth or Venus. Spectra from JWST should make it possible to distinguish between these two scenarios. The planet is tidally locked to its host, meaning it has no day-night cycle like Earth. JWST observations have ruled out any moons larger than 0.1 R_{🜨} around LP 890-9 c. The habitability of LP 890-9 c depends heavily on the initial volatile content and internal properties.

While the planet's location in the habitable zone suggests a strong possibility of an Earth-like atmosphere and climate, the planet's large size may count against its habitability. In addition, the planet is close enough to its star that the powerful radiation may reduce its chances of habitability. Another challenge for the potential habitability of LP 890-9 c is the magma ocean that would have formed during its infancy, which may have lasted for up to 50 million years. This could have removed eight Earth oceans’ worth of water and left 2000 bars of oxygen in its atmosphere, although if its initial hydrogen envelope had 0.1 Earth masses, no water would have been lost. Furthermore, the circulation of the planets orbit would take about 7 billion years, producing hundreds of terawatts of tidal heating.

The LP 890-9 planetary system (Note: Radius, semimajor axis, inclination: Delrez et al. 2022 Mass, period, eccentricity: Stevenson et al. 2026)
Companion (in order from star)	Mass	Semimajor axis (AU)	Orbital period (days)	Eccentricity	Inclination (°)	Radius
b	2.19±0.34 M_{🜨}	0.01875±0.00010	2.7299005(15)	0.095+0.058 −0.047	89.67+0.22 −0.33	1.320+0.053 −0.027 R_{🜨}
d (unconfirmed)	0.24+0.09 −0.10 M_{🜨}	—	4.416+0.011 −0.008	0.047+0.029 −0.023	—	—
c	2.28+0.33 −0.36 M_{🜨}	0.03984±0.00022	8.4574048(12)	0.110+0.068 −0.054	89.287+0.026 −0.047	1.367+0.055 −0.039 R_{🜨}

== See also ==
- Proxima Centauri - Closest star to the Sun, a red dwarf that hosts terrestrial planets with one inside the habitable zone
- Teegarden's Star - A nearby red dwarf in the constellation of Aries with two known terrestrial planets in the habitable zone
- TRAPPIST-1 - An ultra-cool red dwarf in the constellation of Aquarius
- Wolf 359 - A planet-hosting nearby ultra-cool red dwarf in the constellation Leo
