= TRAPPIST =

Pair of Belgian optic robotic telescopes

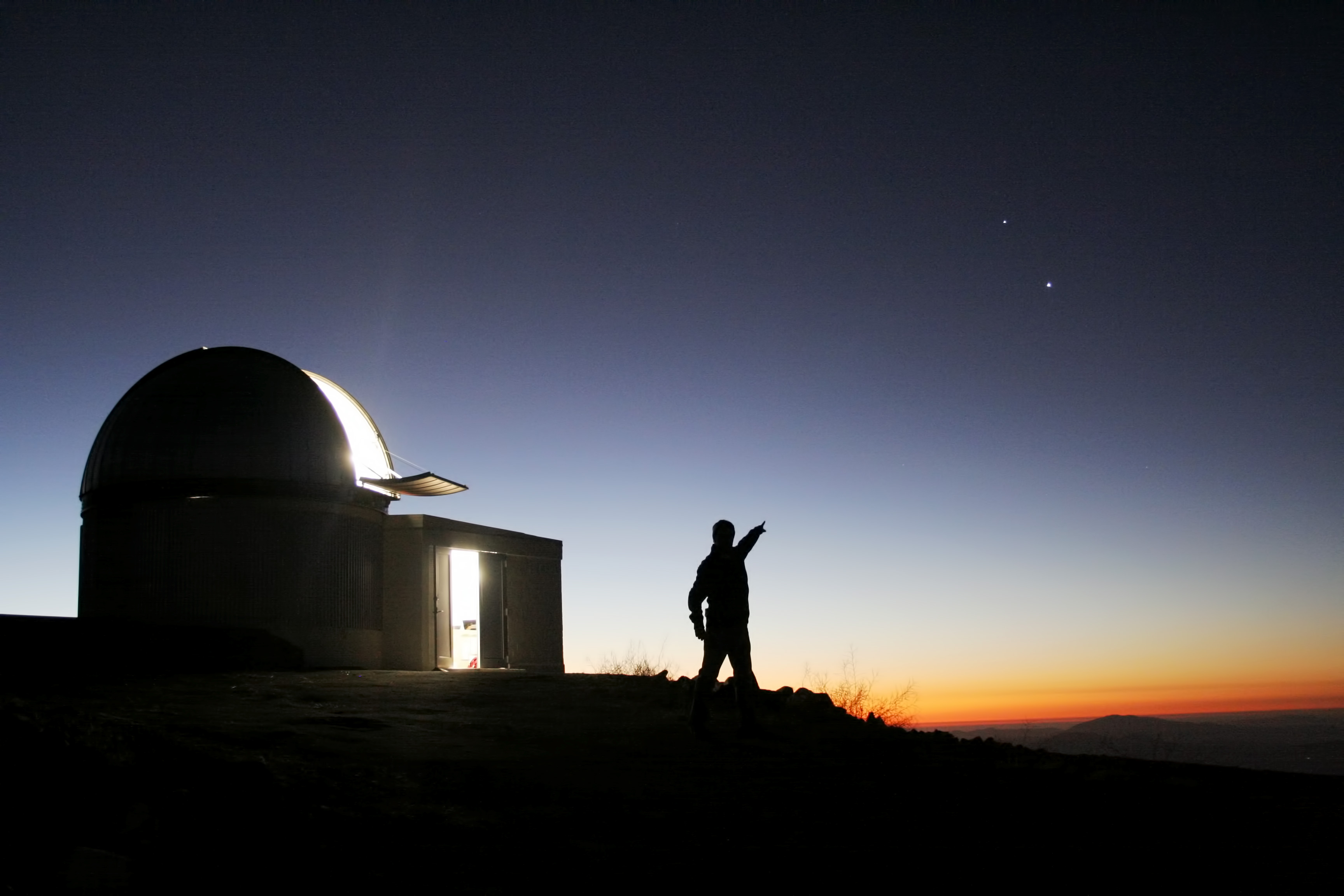
- Location(s): Coquimbo Region, Chile
- Coordinates: 29°15′16″S 70°44′22″W
- Altitude: 2,400 m (7,900 ft)
- Telescope style: Robotic optical telescope
- Website: www.trappist.uliege.be
- Location of TRAPPIST
- Related media on Commons

The Transiting Planets and Planetesimals Small Telescope (TRAPPIST) is the corporate name for a pair of Belgian optic robotic telescopes. TRAPPIST–South, which is situated high in the Chilean mountains at the European Southern Observatory's La Silla Observatory, came online in 2010, and TRAPPIST–North situated at the Oukaïmeden Observatory in the Atlas Mountains in Morocco, came online in 2016.

== Description ==
TRAPPIST is controlled from Liège, Belgium, with some autonomous features. It consists of two 60 cm (24 in) reflecting robotic telescopes located at the ESO La Silla Observatory (housed in the dome of the retired Swiss T70 telescope) in Chile and at Oukaïmeden Observatory in Morocco.

The 60 cm f/8 Ritchey–Chrétien design telescopes and New Technology Mount NTM-500 were built by ASTELCO Systems, a company in Germany. The CCD camera was built by Finger Lakes Instrumentation (USA), providing a 22 x 22 arcminutes field of view. The camera is fitted with a double filter wheel, allowing 12 different filters and one clear position.

The telescope condominium is a joint venture between the University of Liège, Belgium, and the Geneva Observatory, Switzerland, and among other tasks, it specializes in searching for comets and exoplanets.

In November 2010, it was one of the few telescopes that observed a stellar occultation of the planetary body Eris, revealing that it may be smaller than Pluto, and it helped observe a stellar occultation by Makemake, when it passed in front of the star NOMAD 1181-0235723. The observations of this event showed it lacked a significant atmosphere.

A team of astronomers headed by Michaël Gillon, of the Institut d'Astrophysique et Géophysique at the University of Liège in Belgium, used the telescope to observe the ultracool dwarf star 2MASS J23062928-0502285, now also known as TRAPPIST-1. By utilising transit photometry, they discovered seven terrestrial planets, at least three of which were Earth-sized, orbiting the star; the innermost two were found to be tidally locked to their host star while the outermost appears to lie either within the system's habitable zone or just outside of it. The team published its findings in the May 2016 issue of the Nature journal.

While TRAPPIST-1 is the only planetary system discovered by TRAPPIST, other planetary systems have been discovered by SPECULOOS and given SPECULOOS-n designations, with TRAPPIST-1 being SPECULOOS-1.

=== Name ===
As with the other space observation projects of the University of Liège like SPECULOOS, Transiting Planets and Planetesimals Small Telescope is a backronym, referring to traditional Belgian Trappist beer.

== Gallery ==
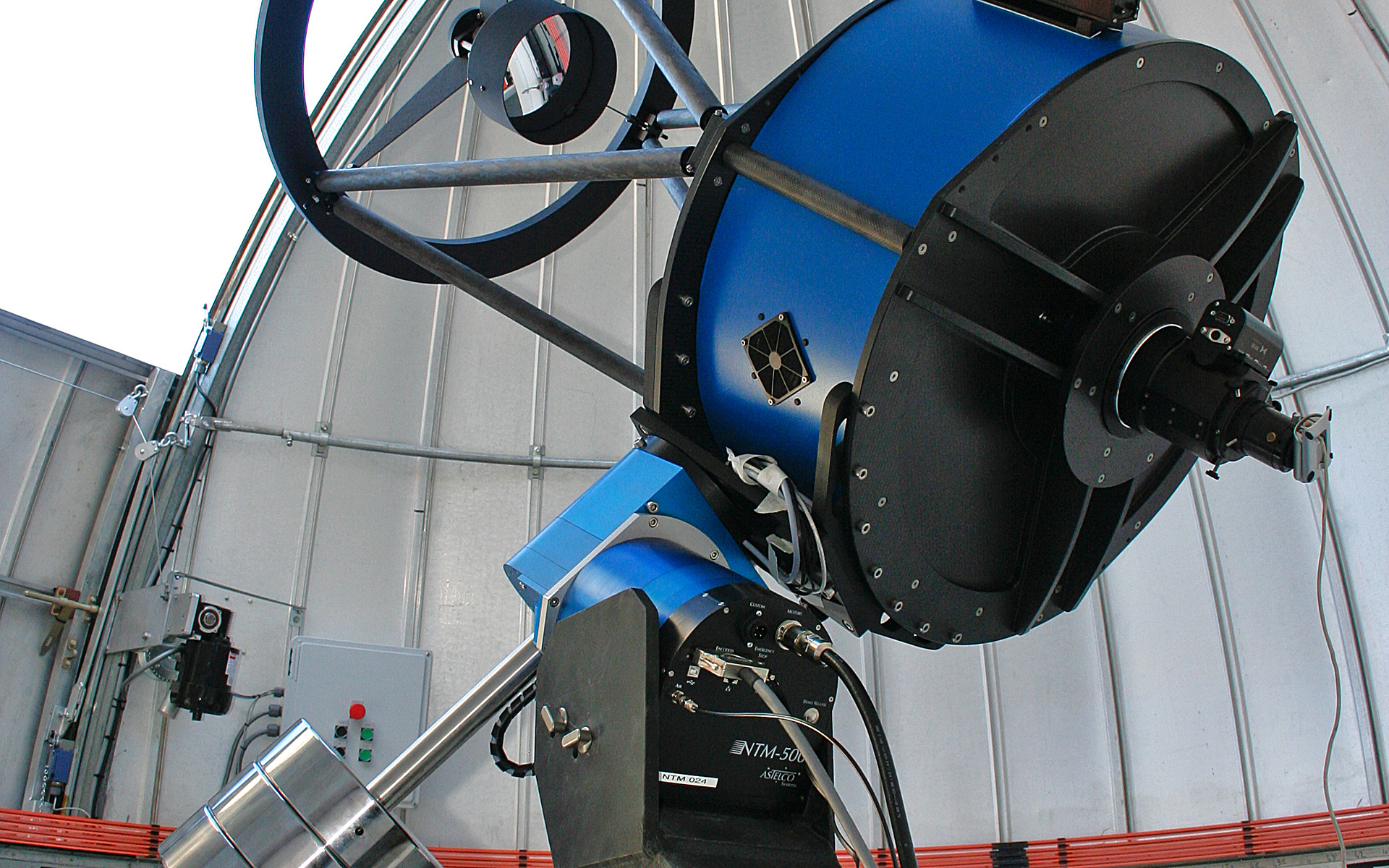
The 60 cm telescope is operated from Liège, Belgium, 12000 km away.

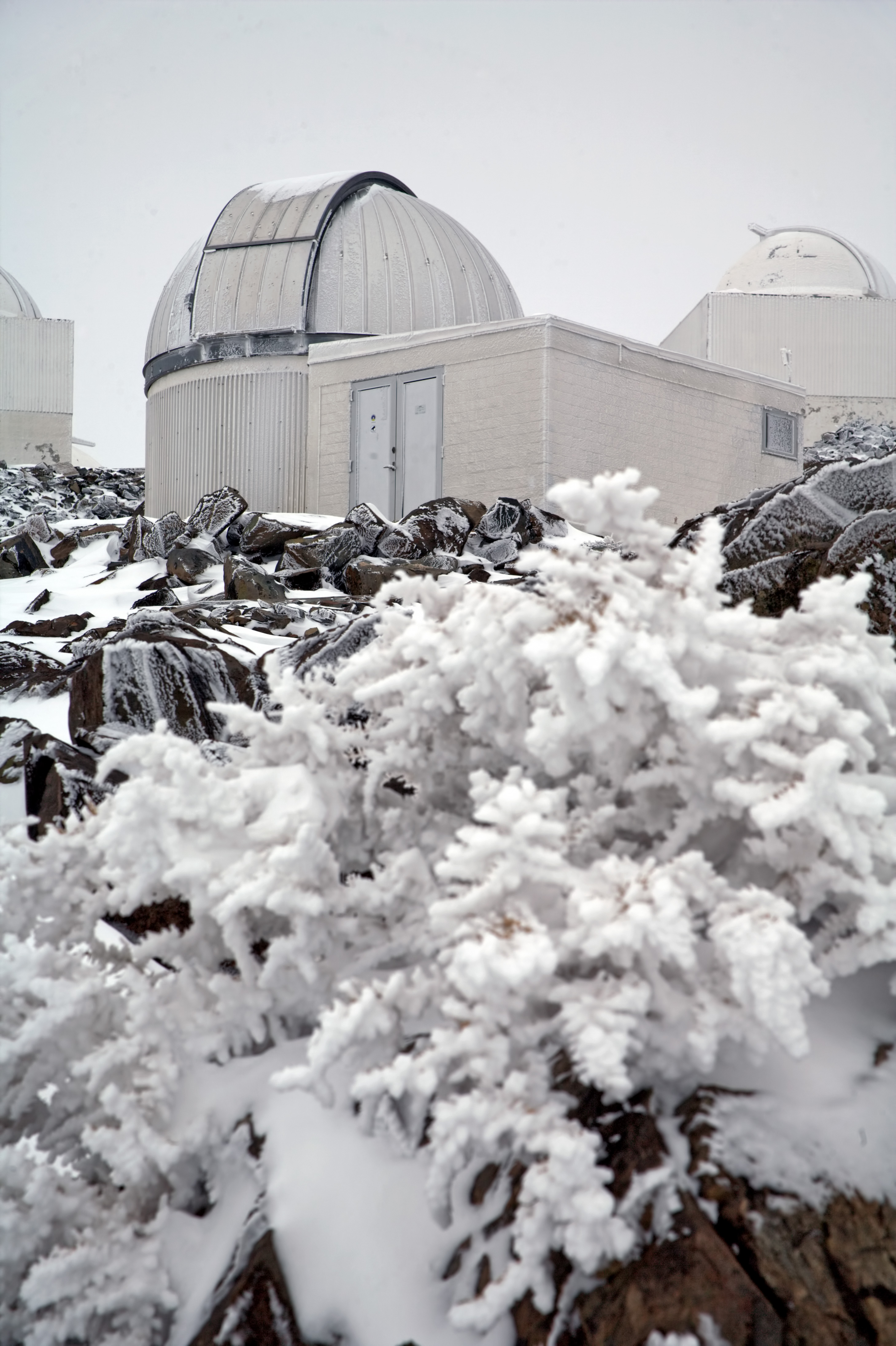
TRAPPIST's enclosure

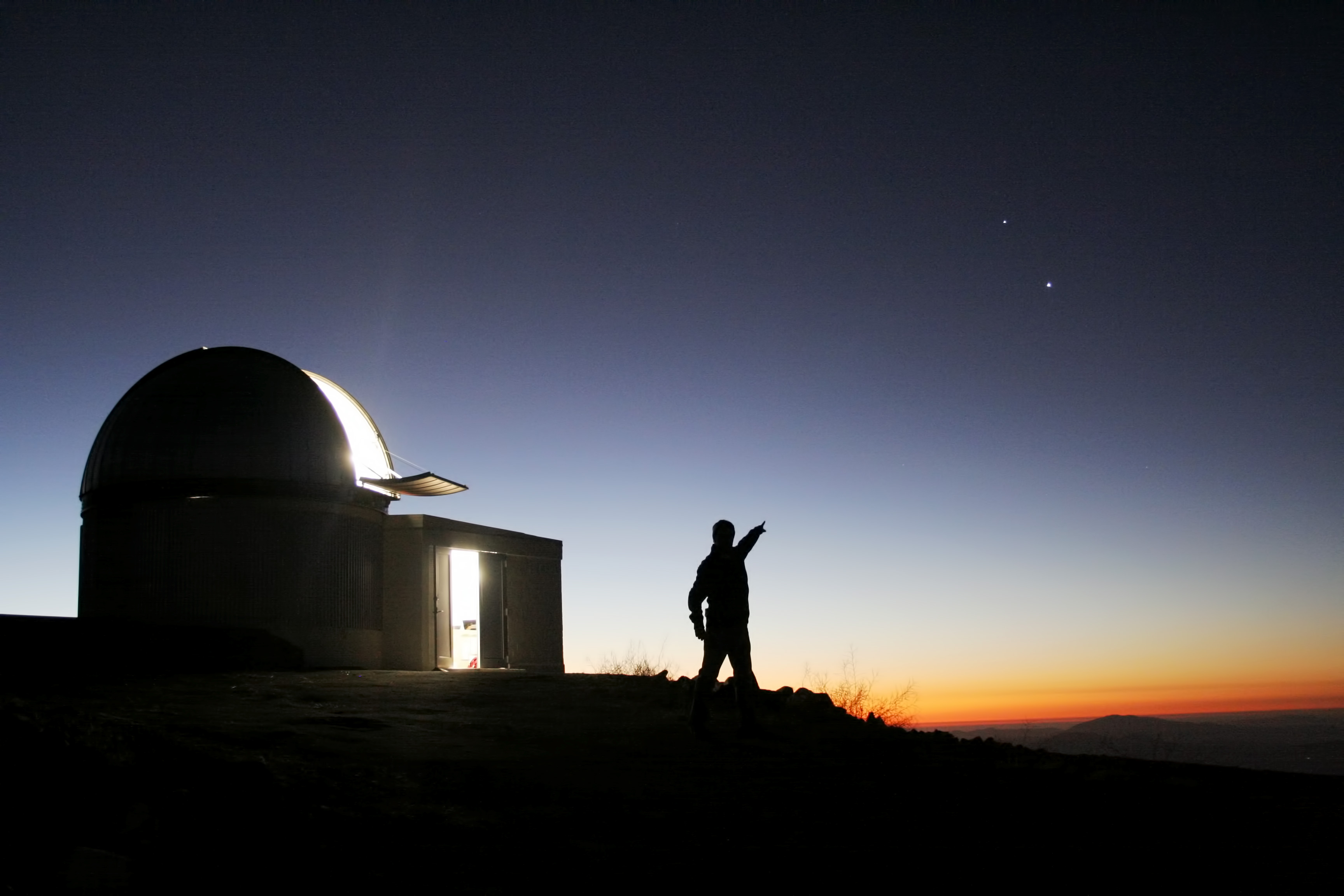
TRAPPIST is housed at the former Swiss T70 telescope site

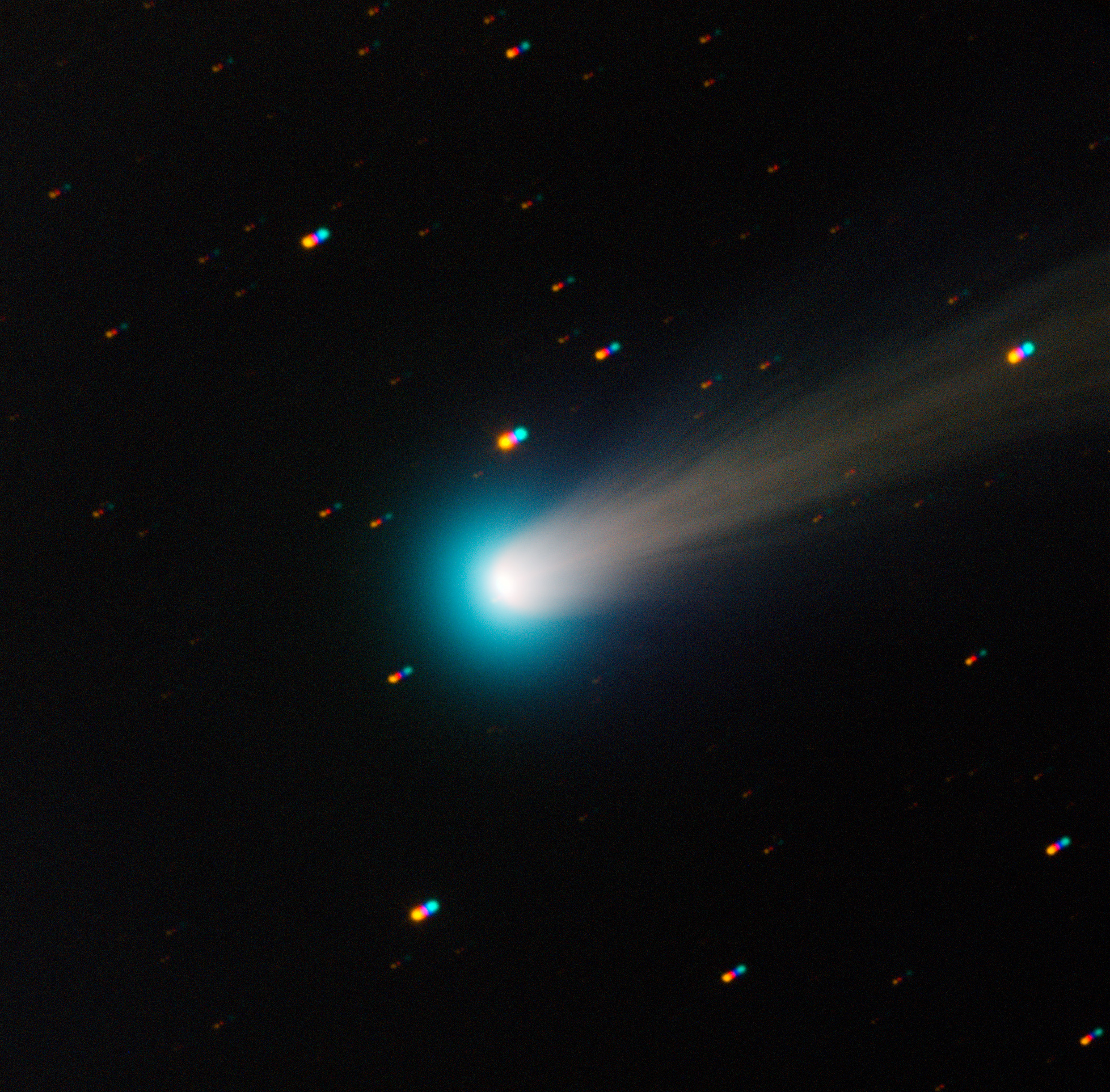
Comet ISON as captured by TRAPPIST before the comet disintegrated a few days later

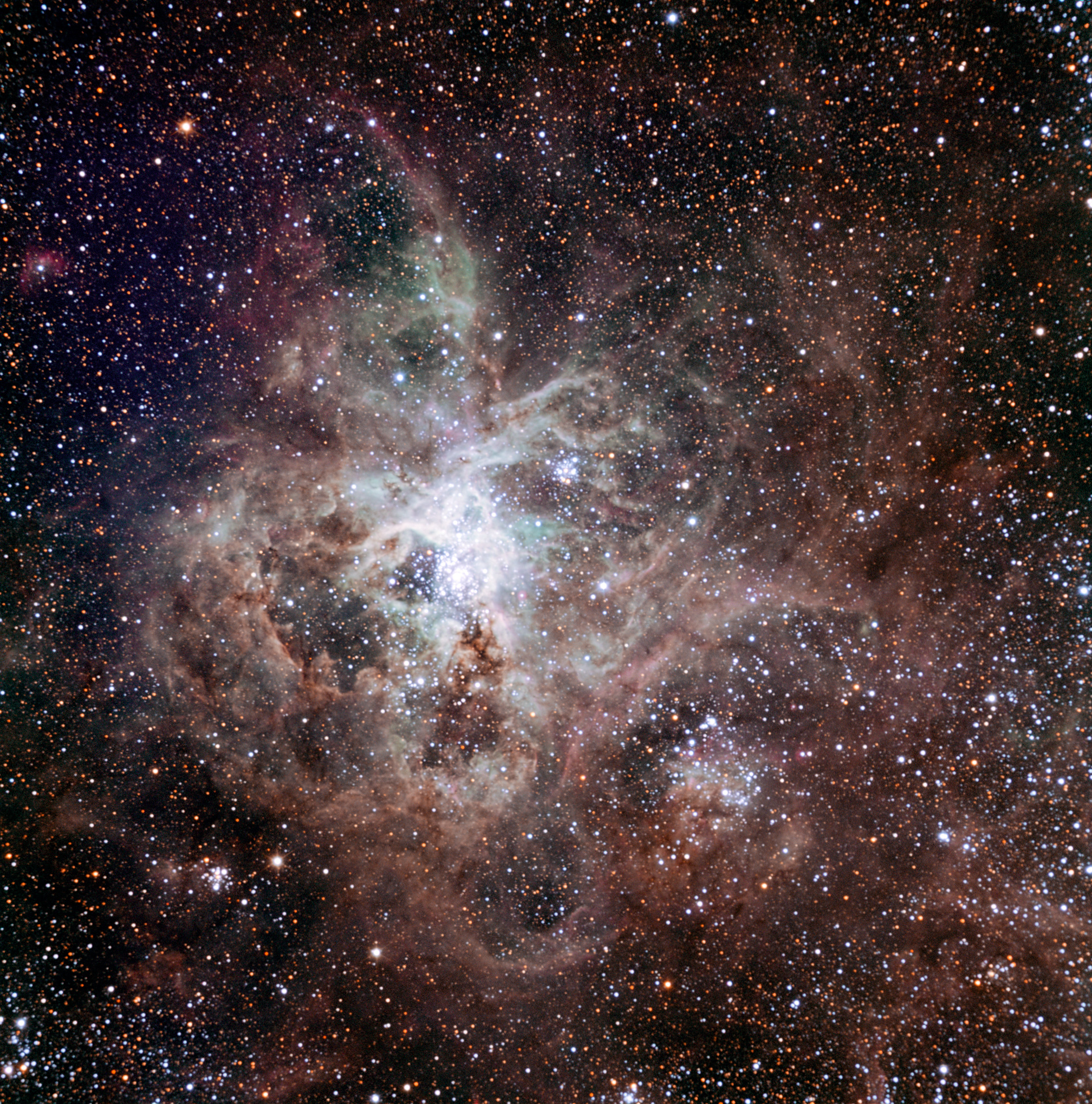
First light image of the Tarantula Nebula taken by TRAPPIST in 2010

The TRAPPIST telescope in its dome at ESO's La Silla Observatory

== See also ==
- Carlsberg Meridian Telescope, a high-precision optical astrometry observatory
- SPECULOOS, a project of the University of Liège to search for exoplanets
