= ASTELCO =

Telescope manufacturer

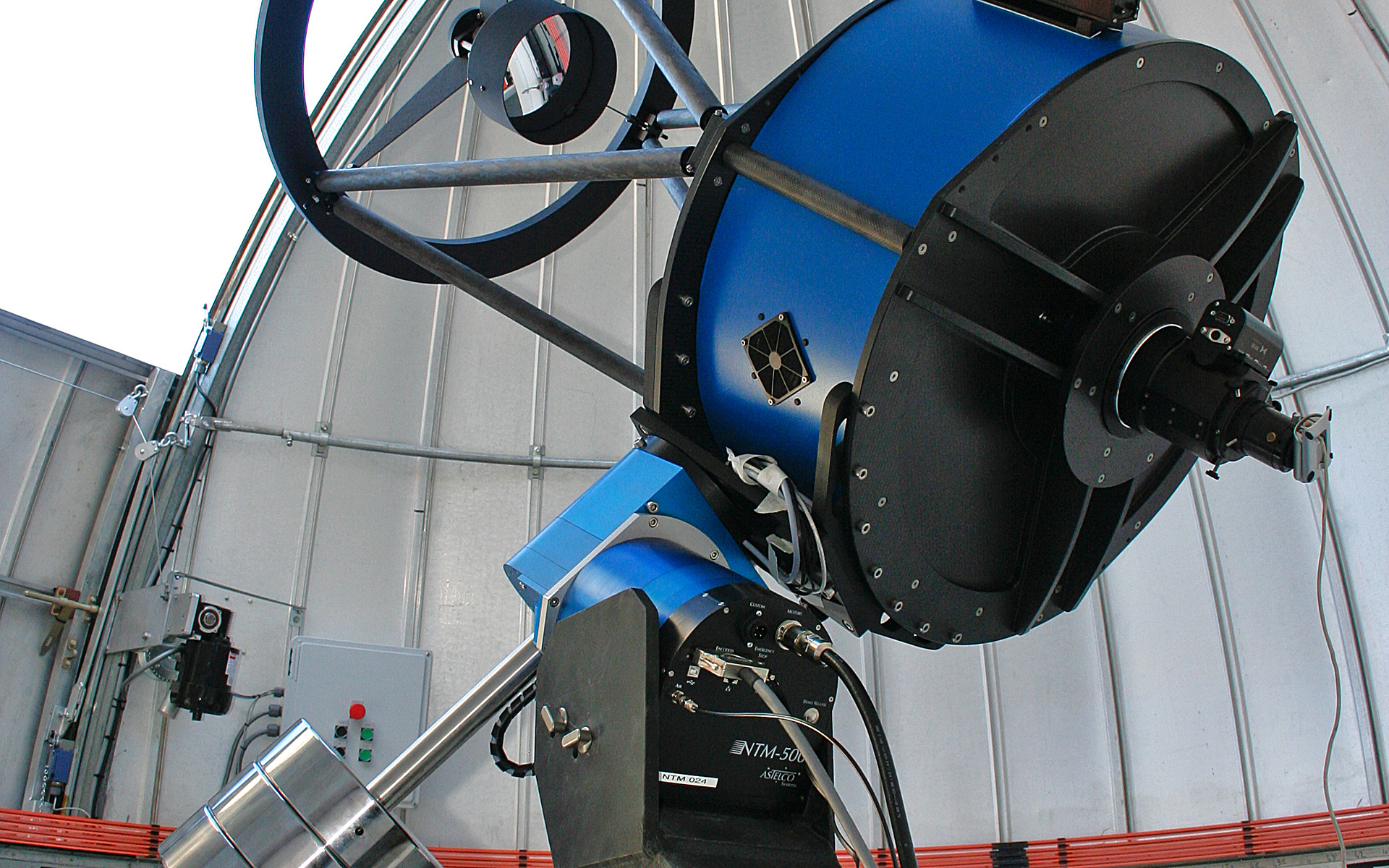
TRAPPIST telescope and mount built by ASTELCO

The company ASTELCO Systems is a manufacturer of telescopes, telescope control systems, domes/enclosures and related technology for professional astronomical research or public use. ASTELCO is located in Sauerlach near Munich and was founded in 2004.

The company built the telescope and mount of the TRAPPIST Telescopes, famous for the discovery of the TRAPPIST-1 system, a red dwarf with seven terrestrial planets. The company also built the telescopes and mounts for the SPECULOOS Southern and Northern Observatory, which are searching for terrestrial planets around ultracool dwarfs and brown dwarfs in the habitable zone. Other projects include the 60 cm Robotic Telescope BOOTES-5 in Mexico, the COATLI robotic 50 cm telescope in Sierra San Pedro Mártir and the prototype for ESO VLT Laser Guide Star Telescope.

The company builds classical Cassegrain and Ritchey-Chrétien telescope designs. The company also builds entire observatories, like the 0.8 m robotic telescope and 8m Lotus dome on top of the Mary Library (Turkmenistan) that is available for public use.
