= Tubomanometry =

Technique for assessing the eustachian tube opening function

Tubomanometry is a technique for assessing the eustachian tube opening function, and sometimes to determine a treatment plan. This technique was familiarised by D. Estève et al in 2001.

== Technique ==
The individual is asked to perform a swallowing maneuver. During this time, the nasal fossae and the nasopharynx are occluded by the velum. A tympanometry earplug is inserted into the external ear of the studied side to avoid fluctuations in ear pressure due to atmospheric conditions. The tubomanometer then creates a dysbarical situation, where the pressure conditions encountered during a rapid drop in altitude is reproduced. This is done by releasing an air bolus into the nasopharynx through airtight nozzles previously placed on both nostrils. At this point, the tubomanometer is able to make several recordings of the pressure variations in the rhinopharynx and on the eardrum as the eustachian tube opens.

== Interpretation ==
Immediate opening of the eustachian tube was observed in healthy subjects at 30-50 mbar pressure. In patients with chronic eustachian tube dysfunction, this opening could be registered in only 42% of the patients at 30 mbar and 58% at 50 mbar. The results are usually interpreted as R values. An R-value less than or equal to one indicates regular eustachian tube function and an R-value greater than 1 indicates a delayed opening of eustachian tube, thereby supporting the diagnosis of chronic eustachian tube dysfunction.
