= Balloon Eustachian tuboplasty =

Procedure to treat Eustachian tube dysfunction

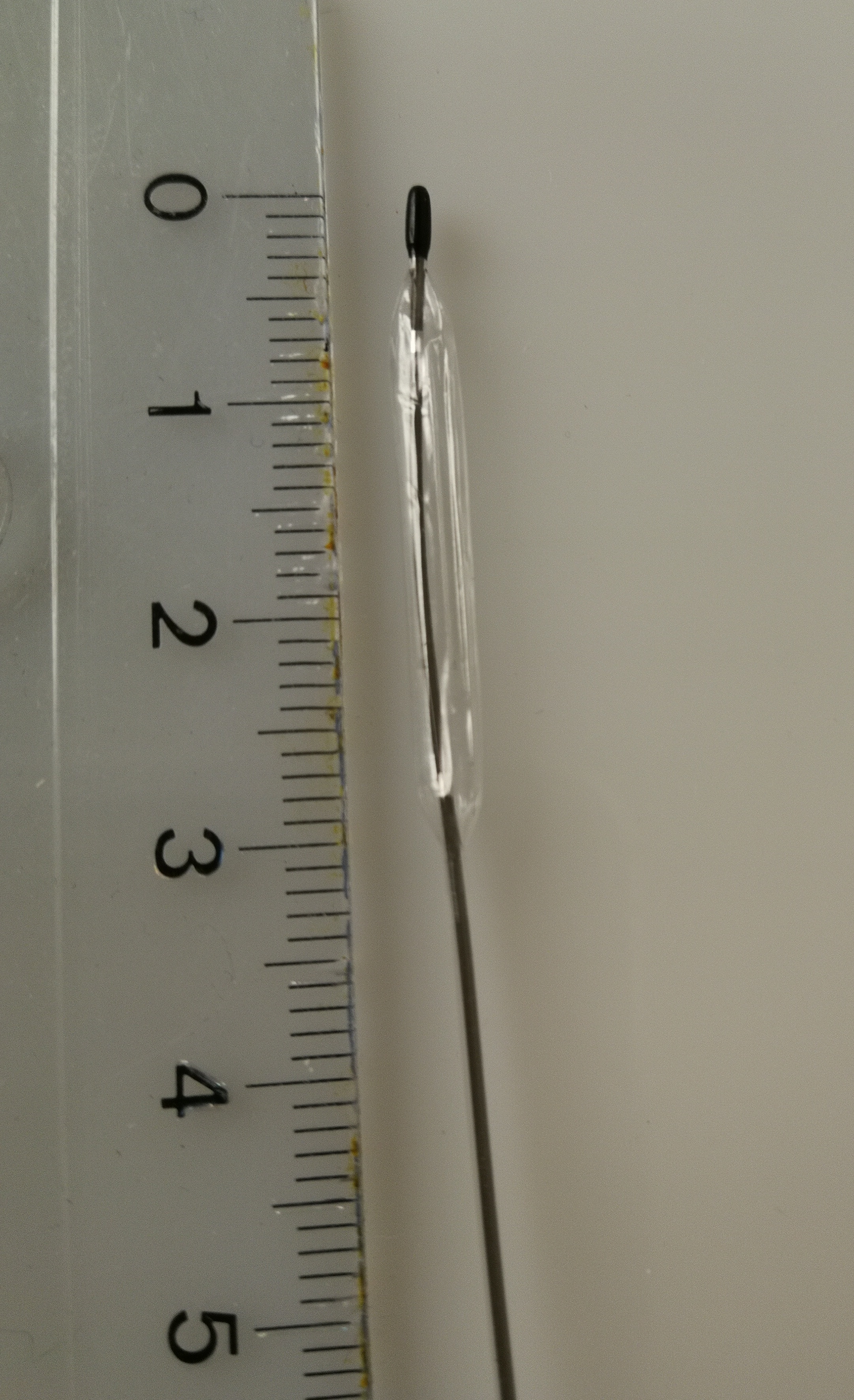
Tip of a dilatation catheter with deflated balloon.

Balloon Eustachian tuboplasty (BET) is a minimally invasive procedure for the causal treatment of Eustachian tube dysfunction (ETD), an often-chronic disorder in which the regulation of middle ear pressure and the removal of secretions are impaired. The dysfunction often causes significant discomfort in affected patients and can trigger additional pathologies.

During dilatation of the Eustachian tube, a purpose built dilatation catheter is inserted into the cartilaginous part of the Eustachian tube under anesthesia as well as endoscopic control. Access is either contralateral or ipsilateral through the nose. If necessary, the endoscope can also be inserted through the oral cavity. An appropriate introducer is used to guide the flexible catheter safely to the tube opening. Once in position, the balloon is dilated by applying a pressure of 10 bar for 2 minutes.

The method was first used in 2009 in both Finland and Germany and has since become an established procedure worldwide. Prospective studies and numerous scientific publications now confirm the high treatment success of the procedure, both in adults and in children.
