= SPECULOOS =

Astronomical observatory

Search for habitable Planets EClipsing ULtra-cOOl Stars
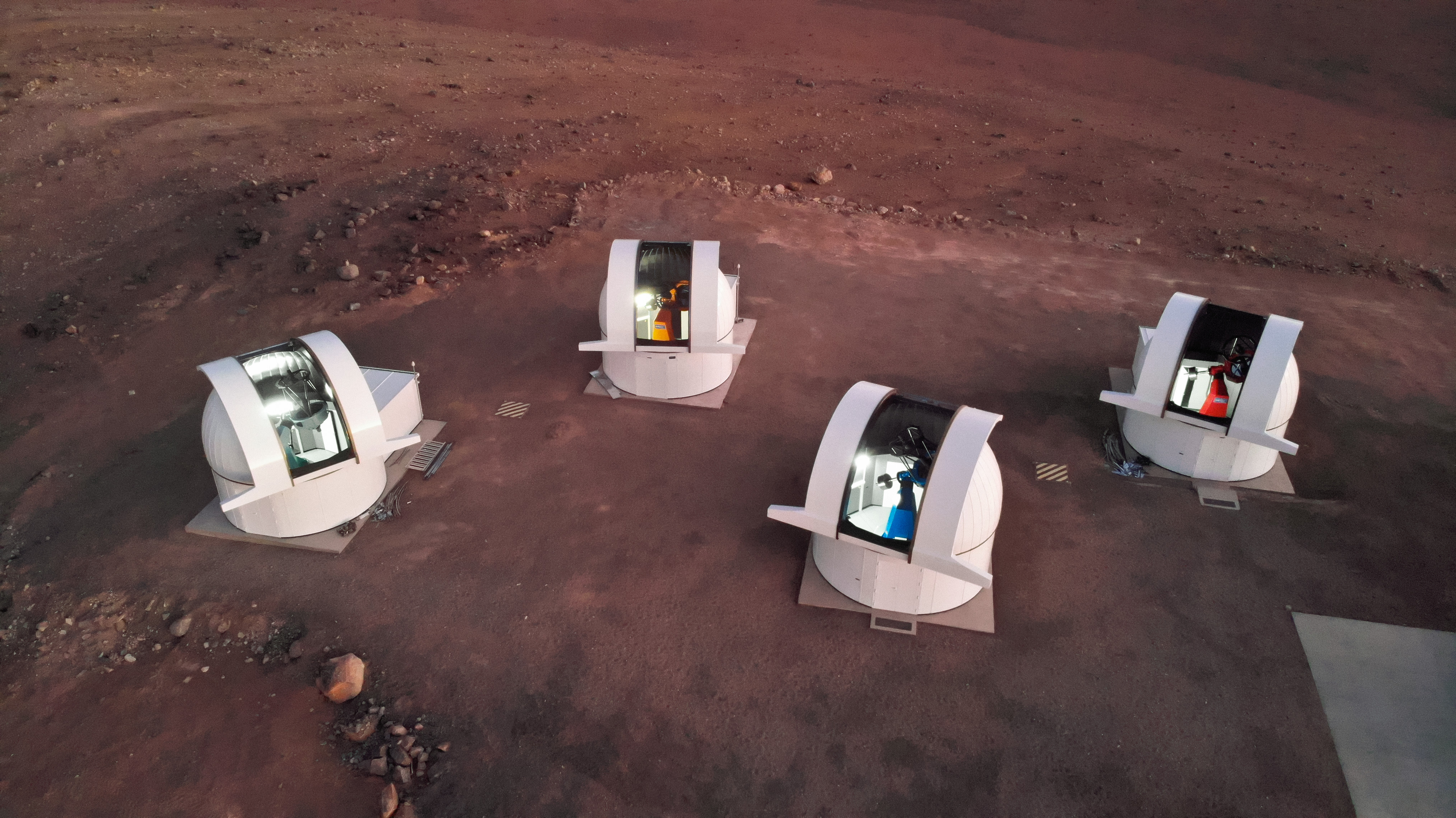
- Alternative names: SPECULOOS
- Location: Chile, Spain
- Telescope style: infrared telescope
- Diameter: 1 m (3 ft 3 in)
- Website: www.speculoos.uliege.be
- Related media on Commons

SPECULOOS (Search for habitable Planets EClipsing ULtra-cOOl Stars) is a project consisting of SPECULOOS Southern Observatory (SSO) at the Paranal Observatory in Chile and SPECULOOS Northern Observatory (SNO) at the Teide Observatory in Tenerife.

The SSO consists of four Ritchey–Chrétien telescopes of 1-metre primary aperture, made by ASTELCO. Each telescope is equipped with a NTM-1000 robotic mount and will search for Earth-sized exoplanets around 1000 ultra-cool stars and brown dwarfs. As of June 2019, the SNO consists of one telescope, but more might be added in the future with up to three telescopes for SNO. SPECULOOS is complemented by SAINT-EX and TRAPPIST.

== Science overview ==
Ultra-cool dwarf stars and brown dwarfs have small radii, causing the transits caused by planets to be deeper. This allows the detection of terrestrial planets around these dwarfs, which are predicted to be common around brown dwarfs. The TRAPPIST-1 system showed that ultra-cool dwarfs form terrestrial planets in the habitable zone. For brown dwarfs, it was predicted that 175 of these objects need to be monitored to find one system with transiting planets.

During the survey operation, each telescope will observe one target for about 10 nights. This kind of observation is optimized for each target to find exoplanets in the habitable zone. To observe 500 targets in the southern hemisphere, 1200 nights or 5 years are needed. The continuous observation of one target is needed to find these exoplanets in the habitable zone around ultra-cool dwarf stars. Such planets are expected to have short transit durations, which can be small as 15 minutes.

== Individual telescopes and first light ==
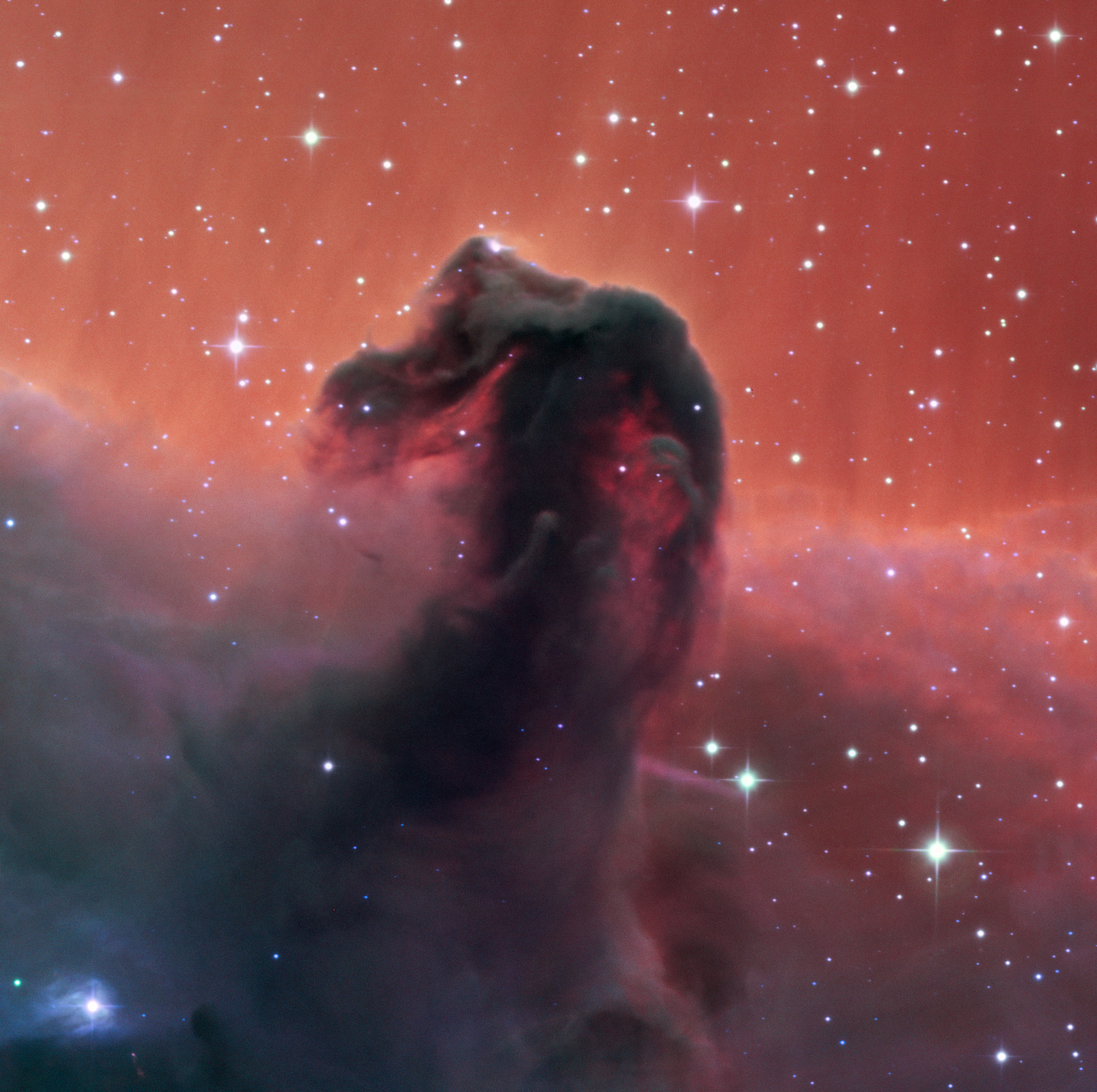
First light image of the SPECULOOS Southern Observatory's Callisto telescope, showing the Horsehead Nebula.

The system of SPECULOOS – South (SSO) comprises four telescopes called Europa, Io, Callisto, and Ganymede. The telescopes are named after the Galilean moons that orbit the planet Jupiter, the most massive planet in the Solar System. The first telescope (Europa) saw its first light in April 2017. The second telescope (Io) began operations in October 2017. As of December 2019, all SPECULOOS – South telescopes are operational. ESO released first light images of SPECULOOS – South on the 2018-12-05. The telescopes took images of the Carina Nebula, the Horsehead Nebula, and the spiral galaxy Messier 83. Artemis is the first telescope for SPECULOOS – North (SNO); it began operations on June 20, 2019.

The robotic observations of each of the four telescopes is controlled by the program ACP Expert. Each telescope is equipped with an Andor Peltier-cooled deeply depleted 2k × 2k CCD camera, and the telescopes have a 12×12-arcminute field of view.

== Wavelength ==
The four 1-meter-diameter telescopes will be equipped with cameras sensitive in the near-infrared, the wavelength range in which ultra-cool stars and brown dwarfs emit most of their light. The detectors are optimized for 700 to 1000 nm wavelengths, to observe ultracool dwarfs with a J-band magnitude of 14 or brighter at good seeing conditions.

== Collaboration ==
SPECULOOS involves scientists from the University of Liège (Belgium), the University of Birmingham (UK), the Cavendish Laboratory, Cambridge (UK), the University of Bern (Swiss), the Massachusetts Institute of Technology, Instituto de Astrofísica de Canarias, and the King Abdulaziz University (Saudi Arabia), under the leadership of Michaël Gillon of the University of Liège. The European Southern Observatory (ESO) supports and hosts the SPECULOOS Southern Observatory (SSO) at the Paranal Observatory.

== Name ==
As with the other space observation projects of the University of Liège like TRAPPIST, the name Search for habitable Planets EClipsing ULtra-cOOl Stars makes up a backronym referring to a Belgian food: in this case, the spiced biscuit known as Speculoos.

== Results ==
The first light data of the SPECULOOS telescopes revealed the eclipsing binary brown dwarf 2M1510A, which is only the second eclipsing binary brown dwarf found so far. The data by SPECULOOS did help to characterise low-mass eclipsing binaries and plays an important part in the follow-up of a new class of rapidly rotating low-mass stars.

SPECULOOS was involved in the discovery of the exoplanet K2-135b, the exoplanets around L 98-59, and the planetary system TOI-178. SAINT-EX, which is part of the SPECULOOS project, helped in the discovery of the planets around TOI-1266.

In 2022, the discovery of two super-Earths, one in the habitable zone, around LP 890-9 using SPECULOOS was announced. This system is also designated SPECULOOS-2, with TRAPPIST-1 being SPECULOOS-1. In 2024, a short-period Earth-sized planet was announced around the ultra-cool dwarf SPECULOOS-3 (LSPM J2049+3336).

Planetary systems discovered as part of the SPECULOOS project
System		Star			Planet		
Name	Dist	SpT	Temp	Radius (R_{☉})	Pl	Period (days)	Radius (R_{🜨})
TRAPPIST-1 (SPECULOOS-1)	40.66±0.04	M8V	2566±26	0.1192(13)	b	1.510826(6)	1.116+0.014 −0.012
TRAPPIST-1 (SPECULOOS-1)	40.66±0.04	M8V	2566±26	0.1192(13)	c	2.421937(18)	1.097+0.014 −0.012
TRAPPIST-1 (SPECULOOS-1)	40.66±0.04	M8V	2566±26	0.1192(13)	d	4.049219(26)	0.788+0.011 −0.010
TRAPPIST-1 (SPECULOOS-1)	40.66±0.04	M8V	2566±26	0.1192(13)	e	6.101013(35)	0.920+0.013 −0.012
TRAPPIST-1 (SPECULOOS-1)	40.66±0.04	M8V	2566±26	0.1192(13)	f	9.207540(32)	1.045+0.013 −0.012
TRAPPIST-1 (SPECULOOS-1)	40.66±0.04	M8V	2566±26	0.1192(13)	g	12.352446(54)	1.129+0.015 −0.013
TRAPPIST-1 (SPECULOOS-1)	40.66±0.04	M8V	2566±26	0.1192(13)	h	18.772866(214)	0.755±0.014
LP 890-9 (SPECULOOS-2)	105.4±0.1	M6V	2850±75	0.1556(86)	b	2.7299025(40)	1.320+0.053 −0.027
LP 890-9 (SPECULOOS-2)	105.4±0.1	M6V	2850±75	0.1556(86)	c	8.457463(24)	1.367+0.055 −0.039
SPECULOOS-3 (LSPM J2049+3336)	54.63±0.04	M6.5V	2800±29	0.1230(22)	b	0.71912603(57)	0.977±0.022

== See also ==
- TRAPPIST, another project of the University of Liège to search for exoplanets
