= Sharmila Makhija =

American surgeon

- Born: Montgomery, Alabama, U.S.
- Occupations: University dean and chief executive officer of Alice L. Walton School of Medicine
- Known for: Women's health and gynecologic oncology
- Board member of: Every Mother Counts, Clinical Leadership Committee of the American Hospital Association

Academic background
- Education: Cornell University (BA); University of Alabama at Birmingham (MD); Emory University (MBA)

Academic work
- Discipline: Gynecologic oncology
- Institutions: Alice L. Walton School of Medicine (since 2023)
- Main interests: Women's health

Sharmila Makhija is an American surgeon specializing in women's health and gynecologic oncology. She is the dean and chief executive officer of the Alice L. Walton School of Medicine in Bentonville, Arkansas.

== Early life and education ==
Makhija is a native of Montgomery, Alabama. Her father was a college chemistry professor and her mother was a high school biology teacher. Her grandfather was a surgeon and general practitioner in India.

Makhija received her Bachelor of Arts in chemistry at Cornell University in 1988. She then completed her medical degree in 1992 at the University of Alabama at Birmingham (UAB). In 1996, she completed her residency at the University of Louisville Hospital for obstetrics and gynecology. She then completed a gynecologic oncology fellowship at Memorial Sloan-Kettering Cancer Center in 1999.

In 2011, Makhija received her Executive Master of Business Administration from Goizueta Business School at Emory University. She worked on her studies while she was director of gynecologic oncology at Emory.

== Career ==
Makhija is a surgeon and considered an international expert on gynecologic cancer. She is an associate editor-in-chief of the Journal of American Association of Physicians of Indian Origin.

=== Higher education ===
Makhija has been a faculty member of University of Pittsburgh (Pitt), University of Louisville (UofL), UAB, and Emory. She was a Women’s Reproductive Health Research Scholar at both Pitt and UAB and held an endowed chair position at Emory. She was also department chair and held endowed chair positions at the UofL School of Medicine and Albert Einstein College of Medicine. At Emory, Makhija was also the division chief of gynecologic oncology and a distinguished cancer scholar of the Georgia Cancer Coalition. While at University of Louisville School of Medicine, Makhija was the chief medical operations officer for the Center for Women and Infants.

Makhija was appointed as the founding university dean and chief executive officer of Alice L. Walton School of Medicine in 2023.

=== Board service and recognition ===
Makhija is the impact committee chair of Every Mother Counts. She has served on various boards, including the Clinical Leadership Committee of the American Hospital Association, GigCapital5, and the Graduate Medical Education Residency Expansion Board.

She received the Albert Einstein College of Medicine’s Reproductive Health Spirit of Achievement. She also received the Argus Teaching Award from the UAB medical school and was called a "humanitarian hero" by Good Housekeeping.
