= Patulous Eustachian tube =

Medical condition of the middle ear

- Other names: Patent Eustachian tube
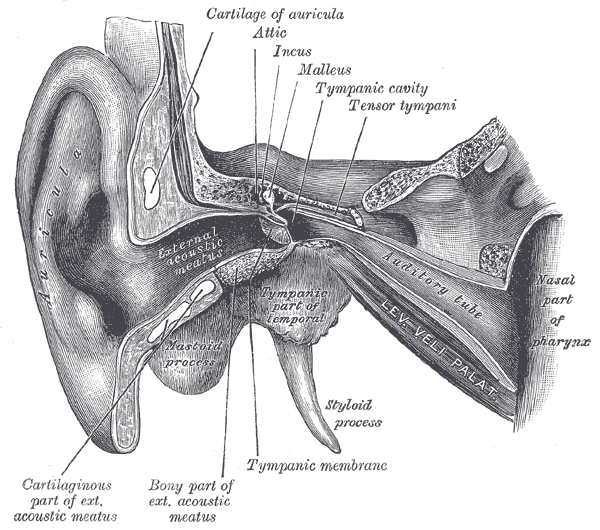
- External and middle ear. (The Eustachian tube is labeled "auditory tube".)
- Specialty: ENT surgery

Patulous Eustachian tube is the name of a physical disorder where the Eustachian tube, which is normally closed, instead stays intermittently open. When this occurs, the person experiences autophony, the hearing of self-generated sounds. These sounds, such as one's own breathing, voice, and heartbeat, vibrate directly onto the ear drum and can create a "bucket on the head" effect, making it difficult for the patient to attend to environmental sounds. Patulous Eustachian tube is a form of Eustachian tube dysfunction, which is said to be present in about 1 percent of the general population.

== Signs and symptoms ==
With patulous Eustachian tube, variations in upper airway pressure associated with respiration are transmitted to the middle ear through the Eustachian tube. This causes an unpleasant fullness feeling in the middle ear and alters the auditory perception. Complaints seem to include muffled hearing and autophony. In addition, patulous Eustachian tube generally feels dry with no clogged feeling or sinus pressure.

Patients hear their own voice or its echo from inside. They describe it as being amplified and unpleasant. Lying head down may help since it increases venous blood pressure and congestion of the mucosa.

== Causes ==
Patulous Eustachian tube is a physical disorder. The exact causes may vary depending on the person and are often unknown. Weight loss is a commonly cited cause of the disorder due to the nature of the Eustachian tube itself and is associated with approximately one-third of reported cases. Fatty tissues hold the tube closed most of the time in healthy individuals. When circumstances cause overall body fat to diminish, the tissue surrounding the Eustachian tube shrinks and this function is disrupted.

Activities and substances which dehydrate the body have the same effect and are also possible causes of patulous Eustachian tube. Examples are stimulants (including caffeine) and exercise. Exercise may have a more short-term effect than caffeine or weight loss in this regard.

Pregnancy can also be a cause of patulous Eustachian tube due to the effects of pregnancy hormones on surface tension and mucus in the respiratory system.

Granulomatosis with polyangiitis can also be a cause of this disorder. It is yet unknown why.

Patulous Eustachian tube can occur as a result of liquid residue in the Eustachian tube, following a middle ear infection (otitis media).

=== Potential causes list ===
- Longitudinal concave defect in the mucosal valve
- Sudden weight loss
- Radiation therapy
- High levels of estrogen
- Nasal decongestants
- Stress
- Neurological disorders

There hasn't been much comprehensive scientific research conducted to establish a clear correlation between most of the claimed potential causes and patulous Eustachian tube disorder.

== Diagnosis ==
Upon examination of a suspected case of patulous Eustachian tube, a doctor can directly view the tympanic membrane with a light and observe that it vibrates with every breath taken by the patient. A tympanogram may also help with the diagnosis. Patulous Eustachian tube is likely if brisk inspiration causes a significant pressure shift.

Patulous Eustachian tube is frequently misdiagnosed as standard congestion due to the similarity in symptoms and rarity of the disorder. Audiologists are more likely to recognize the disorder, usually with tympanometry or nasally delivered masking noise during a hearing assessment, which is highly sensitive to this condition.

When misdiagnosis occurs, a decongestant medication is sometimes prescribed. This type of medication aggravates the condition, as the Eustachian tube relies on sticky fluids to keep closed and the drying effect of a decongestant would make it even more likely to remain open and cause symptoms.

Patients who instead have the even rarer condition of superior canal dehiscence are at risk for misdiagnosis of patulous Eustachian tube due to the similar autophony in both conditions.

== Treatment ==
Estrogen nasal drops or saturated potassium iodide have been used to induce edema of the Eustachian tube opening. Nasal medications containing dilute hydrochloric acid, chlorobutanol, and benzyl alcohol have been reported to be effective in some patients, with few side effects. Food and Drug Administration approval is still pending, however. Nasal sprays have also been a very effective temporary treatment for this disease, as well.

In extreme cases surgical intervention may attempt to restore the Eustachian tube tissues with fat, gel foam, or cartilage or scar it closed with cautery. These methods are not always successful. For example, there is the case of the early attempts at surgical correction involving injections of tetrafluoroetheylene (Teflon) paste but although this treatment gave transient relief, it was discontinued due to several deaths that resulted from inadvertent intracarotid injections.

Although a temporary solution, surgical ventilation tube placement in the ear drum has also proven to be an effective treatment option. This treatment is known as either a unilateral or bilateral myringotomy. 50% of patients reported relief of patulous Eustachian tube symptoms when given this treatment.
