= Lyndsay Fletcher =

Scottish astrophysicist

Lyndsay Fletcher FRSE
- Born: 3 December 1968 (age 57)
- Education: Bellahouston Academy; University of Glasgow (BSc, PhD)
- Awards: RAS Harold Jeffreys Lecturer 2011; MBE 2025
- Scientific career
- Fields: astrophysics solar physics solar flares
- Workplaces: University of Glasgow; European Space Agency; Utrecht University; Lockheed Martin
- Thesis: H impact polarization as a solar and astrophysical particle diagnostic (1993)
- Website: www.gla.ac.uk/schools/physics/staff/lyndsayfletcher and https://www.astro.gla.ac.uk/?p=123

Lyndsay Fletcher (born 1968) FRSE is a Scottish astrophysicist at the University of Glasgow who specialises in solar flares.

== Early life and education ==
Fletcher attended Bellahouston Academy in Glasgow, and credits her high school physics teacher there with her enjoyment of physics. She studied physics and astronomy at the University of Glasgow and graduated in 1989. She remained there for her graduate studies, earning a PhD in 1993.

== Research and career ==
In 1993 Fletcher joined Utrecht University as a postdoctoral researcher. She was then appointed a research fellow at the European Space Agency (ESA) in Noordwijk in 1996, where she remained for two years working on the Solar and Heliospheric Observatory.

In 1998 she joined Lockheed Martin in Palo Alto, California, using the Yohkoh and TRACE satellites to study flares and plasma jets from the sun. She returned to Glasgow in 2000, becoming a lecturer later that year and a Professor in 2014. She is an authority on solar flares, notably espousing the role of Alfvénic transport of energy. In 2015 she was appointed the President of the International Astronomical Union Commission E2 on Solar Activity. Between 2014 and 2016 she led the Seventh Framework Programme (FP7) project F-CHROMA, which included the citizen science project F-HUNTERS. She co-edited the book Solar and Stellar Flares, in 2017.

=== Public service ===
Fletcher was a member of the Royal Astronomical Society council from 2006 to 2009. In 2011 she became the Geophysics Secretary, and in 2017 the Senior Secretary. Fletcher has campaigned for diversity in physics and supports the Institute of Physics Juno campaign. She was elected a fellow of the Royal Society of Edinburgh (FRSE) in 2017. She serves on the Science Working group for the Daniel K. Inouye Solar Telescope. She is an advisor for the Rosseland Centre for Solar Physics at the University of Oslo and for the Kiepenheuer Institute for Solar Physics. Fletcher has spoken at the Edinburgh International Science Festival, Glasgow Science Centre, British Astronomical Association and the Institute of Physics in Scotland.

=== Awards and honours ===
Her awards and honours include:

- 2025 – Awarded MBE
- 2017 – Elected a Fellow of the Royal Society of Edinburgh (FRSE)
- 2017 – The Herald Diversity Hero of the Year
- 2017 – Suffrage Science Awardee
- 2013 – NASA Group Achievement Award for Reuven Ramaty High Energy Solar Spectroscopic Imager (RHESSI)
- 2011 – Delivered the Harold Jeffreys award lecture at the Royal Astronomical Society
- 1999 – Lockheed Martin Advanced Technology Center Award for Technical Excellence
