= Autophony =

- Other names: Tympanophony

Autophony (also tympanophony) is the unusually loud hearing of a person's own voice.

Possible causes include:

- The "occlusion effect", caused by an object, such as an unvented hearing aid or a plug of ear wax, blocking the ear canal and reflecting sound vibration back towards the eardrum.
- Serous otitis media
- Open or patulous Eustachian tube, allowing vocal or breathing sounds to be conducted into the middle ear
- Superior canal dehiscence, which can lead to an abnormally amplified bone conduction of sound into the inner ear. Persons with superior canal dehiscence syndrome (SCDS) typically hear not only their own voice but also heartbeat, footsteps, chewing, intestinal sounds and possibly even the sound of their eye movements when reading.
