= Czech Astronomical Society =

Association of professional and amateur astronomers

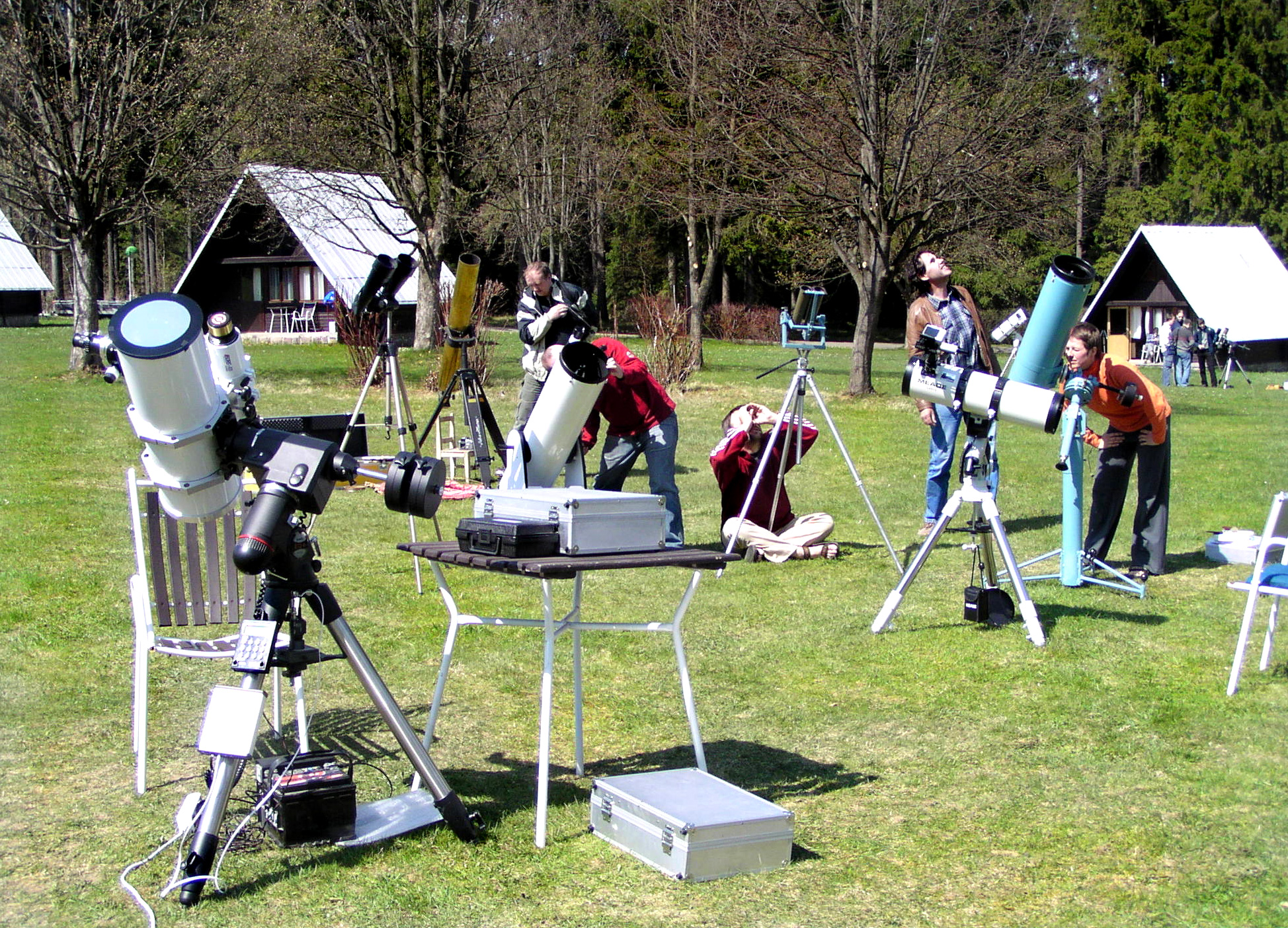
- Abbreviation: CAS
- Formation: 1917; 109 years ago
- Type: NGO, learned society
- Website: www.astro.cz

The Czech Astronomical Society (CAS) is a voluntary association of experts and researchers in astronomy, amateur astronomers, and members of the public with an interest in astronomy. CAS promotes the development of astronomy in Czechia. CAS is a collective member of the European Astronomical Society. It was founded in 1917 and in 1928, it opened the Štefánik Observatory in Prague. Among other activities, CAS actively promotes reduction of light pollution, organizes the Czech Astronomy Olympiad, and manages the Exoplanet Transit Database.
