= Superior canal dehiscence syndrome =

- Other names: SCDS
- Specialty: Neurotology, neurology, ENT

The semicircular canal dehiscence (SCD) is a category of rare neurotological diseases/disorders affecting the inner ears, comprising the superior, lateral and posterior semi-circular ducts. These SCDs induce SCD syndromes (SCDSs), which define specific sets of hearing and balance symptoms. This entry mainly deals with the superior SCDS.

The superior semicircular canal dehiscence syndrome (SSCDS) is a set of hearing and balance symptoms induced by a rare disease/disorder of the inner ear's superior semicircular canal/duct. The symptoms are caused by a thinning or complete absence of the part of the temporal bone overlying the superior semicircular canal of the vestibular system. There is evidence that this rare defect, or susceptibility, is congenital. There are also numerous cases of symptoms arising after physical trauma to the head. It was first described in 1998 by Lloyd B. Minor of Johns Hopkins University in Baltimore.

== Symptoms ==
The superior canal dehiscence can affect both hearing and balance to different extents in different people.

Symptoms of the SCDS include:

- Autophony – person's own speech or other self-generated noises (e.g. heartbeat, eye movements, creaking joints, chewing) are heard unusually loudly in the affected ear
- Dizziness/vertigo – chronic disequilibrium caused by the dysfunction of the superior semicircular canal
- Tullio phenomenon – sound-induced vertigo, disequilibrium or dizziness, nystagmus and oscillopsia
- Pulse-synchronous oscillopsia
- Hyperacusis – the over-sensitivity to sound
- Low-frequency conductive hearing loss
- A feeling of fullness in the affected ear
- Brain fog
- Fatigue
- Headache/migraine
- Tinnitus – high pitched ringing in the ear

=== Symptoms in detail ===
- SCDS-related autophony differs greatly in quality and range from the more common form which results from an open, or patulous Eustachian tube through which individuals affected by this disorder hear the sound of their own voice and breathing. In contrast, patients with SCDS-related autophony report hearing their own voice as a disturbingly loud and distorted "kazoo-like" sound deep inside the head as if relayed through "a cracked loudspeaker." Additionally they may hear the creaking and cracking of joints, the sound of their footsteps when walking or running, their heartbeat and the sound of chewing and other digestive noises. Some affected individuals experience such a high level of conductive hyperacusis that a tuning fork placed on the ankle will be heard in the affected ear. The phenomenon of being able to hear the sound of the eyeballs moving in their sockets (e.g. when reading in a quiet room) "like sandpaper on wood" is one of the more distinctive features of this condition and is almost exclusively associated with SCDS.
- Tullio phenomenon, another of the more identifiable symptoms leading to a positive SCD diagnosis is sound-induced loss of balance. Patients showing this symptom may experience a loss of equilibrium, a feeling of motion sickness or even actual nausea, triggered by normal everyday sounds. Although this is often associated with loud noises, volume is not necessarily a factor. Patients describe a wide range of sounds that affect balance: the 'rattle' of a plastic bag; a cashier tossing coins into the register; a telephone ringing; a knock at the door; music; the sound of children playing and even the patient's own voice are typical examples of sounds that can cause a loss of balance when this condition is present, although there are countless others. The presence of Tullio may also mean that involuntary eye movements (nystagmus), sometimes rotational, are set off by sound, giving the affected person the impression that the world is tipping, clockwise or anticlockwise, depending on the site of the dehiscence. Some patients report this tilt as being as much as 15°. For such persons, a visit to the concert hall or to a noisy playground may seem like being at the epicenter of an earthquake. Straining (Valsalva maneuver) or pressure changes in the ear canal can likewise trigger vertigo and oscillopsia.
- Low-frequency conductive hearing loss is present in many patients with SCDS and is explained by the dehiscence acting as a "third window." Vibrations entering the ear canal and middle ear are then abnormally diverted through the superior semicircular canal and up into the intracranial space where they become absorbed instead of being registered as sound in the hearing center, the cochlea. Due to the difference in resistance between the normal round window and the pathological dehiscence window this hearing loss is more serious in the lower frequencies and may initially be mistaken for otosclerosis. In some patients there is true enhancement of low frequency hearing via bone conducted sound. A clinical sign of this phenomenon is the ability of the patient to hear (not feel) a tuning fork placed upon the ankle bone.
- Pulsatile tinnitus is yet another of the typical symptoms of SCDS and is caused by the gap in the dehiscent bone allowing the normal pulse-related pressure changes within the cranial cavity to enter the inner ear abnormally. These pressure changes affect the sound of the tinnitus which will be perceived as containing a pulse-synchronized "wave" or "blip" which patients describe as a "swooshing" sound or as being like the chirrup of a cricket or grasshopper.
- Brain fog and fatigue are both common SCDS symptoms and are caused by the brain having to spend an unusual amount of its energy on the simple act of keeping the body in a state of equilibrium when it is constantly receiving confusing signals from the dysfunctional semicircular canal.
- Headache and migraine are also often mentioned by patients showing other symptoms of SCDS due to the body overcompensating for poor hearing in the affected ear by tensing up nearby parts of the face, head, and neck and using them as almost a secondary eardrum.

== Causes ==
According to current research, in approximately 2.5% of the general population the bones of the head develop to only 60–70% of their normal thickness in the months following birth. This genetic predisposition may explain why the section of temporal bone separating the superior semicircular canal from the cranial cavity, normally 0.8 mm thick, shows a thickness of only 0.5 mm, making it more fragile and susceptible to damage through physical head trauma or from slow erosion. An explanation for this erosion of the bone has not yet been found.

== Diagnosis ==
The presence of dehiscence can be detected by a high definition (0.6 mm or less) coronal CT scan of the temporal bone, currently the most reliable way to distinguish between superior canal dehiscence syndrome (SCDS) and other conditions of the inner ear involving similar symptoms such as Ménière's disease, perilymphatic fistula and cochlea-facial nerve dehiscence. Other diagnostic tools include the vestibular evoked myogenic potential or VEMP test, videonystagmography (VNG), electrocochleography (ECOG) and the rotational chair test. An accurate diagnosis is of great significance as unnecessary exploratory middle ear surgery may thus be avoided. Several of the symptoms typical to SCDS (e.g. vertigo and Tullio) may also be present singly or as part of Ménière's disease, sometimes causing the one illness to be confused with the other. There are reported cases of patients being affected by both Ménière's disease and SCDS concurrently.

As SCDS is a very rare and still a relatively unknown condition, obtaining an accurate diagnosis of this distressing (and even disabling) disease may take some time as many health care professionals are not yet aware of its existence and frequently dismiss symptoms as being mental health-related.

== Treatment ==
Once diagnosed, the gap in the temporal bone can be repaired by surgical resurfacing of the affected bone or plugging of the superior semicircular canal. These techniques are performed by accessing the site of the dehiscence either via a middle fossa craniotomy or via a canal drilled through the transmastoid bone behind the affected ear. Bone cement has been the material most often used, in spite of its tendency to slippage and resorption, and a consequent high failure rate; recently, soft tissue grafts have been substituted.

== Eponym ==
Occasionally this disorder has been referred to as Minor's syndrome, after its discoverer, Lloyd B. Minor. However, that eponym has also been given to an unrelated condition, the paralysis and anaesthesia following a spinal injury, which is named after the Russian neurologist, Lazar Minor (1855–1942). In the latter case this term is now nearly obsolete.

== Known cases ==
- Sean McDonough, ESPN sportscaster
