= Nature Astronomy =

- Discipline: Astronomy, Astrophysics, Cosmology and Planetary science
- Language: English
- Edited by: Paul Woods

Publication details
- History: 2017–present
- Publisher: Nature Portfolio (United Kingdom)
- Frequency: Monthly
- Open access: Hybrid
- Impact factor: 13.9 (2024)

Standard abbreviations
- ISO 4: Nat. Astron.

Indexing
- ISSN: 2397-3366
- LCCN: 2018242063
- OCLC no.: 1165479718

Links
- Journal homepage; Online access; Online archive

Nature Astronomy is a peer reviewed scientific journal published by Nature Portfolio. It was first published in January 2017 (volume 1, issue 1), although the first content appeared online in December 2016. The editor-in-chief is Paul Woods, who is a full-time professional editor employed by the journal. Woods took over the leadership of the journal in April 2024 from May Chiao, who launched the journal. The founding editors of this journal, in addition to May Chiao, were Paul Woods, Luca Maltagliati and Marios Karouzos.

== Abstracting and indexing ==
The journal is abstracted and indexed in:

- Astrophysics Data System (ADS)
- Science Citation Index Expanded
- Scopus

According to the Journal Citation Reports, the journal has a 2024 impact factor of 13.9, ranking it 5th out of 69 journals in the category "Astronomy & Astrophysics", behind four Review journals. Nature Astronomy is the leading primary research journal in astronomy & astrophysics, ranked by Journal Impact Factor.
