= Exoplanet Transit Database =

- Website type: Astronomy
- Creators: Operated by the Czech Astronomical Society by its Variable Stars and Exoplanet Section
- Website: http://var2.astro.cz/ETD/
- Current status: Active

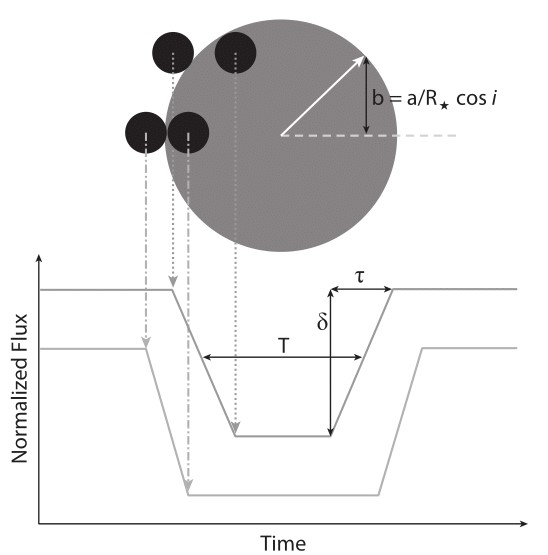
Theoretical Transiting Exoplanet Light Curve

The Exoplanet Transit Database (ETD) is a database operated by the Variable Star and Exoplanet Section of the Czech Astronomical Society. The database came online in September 2008 and consists of three sections: transit prediction, processing, uploading data. The ETD gives information about mid-transit time, duration, and depth of transit, among other parameters. Together with the NASA Exoplanet Archive, it is considered one of the main databases that allows astronomers to predict transit events and schedule observation sessions. The database includes transit light curves of exoplanets that are suitable for ground‐based observations.
