= Lloyd B. Minor =

American surgeon and academic (born 1957)

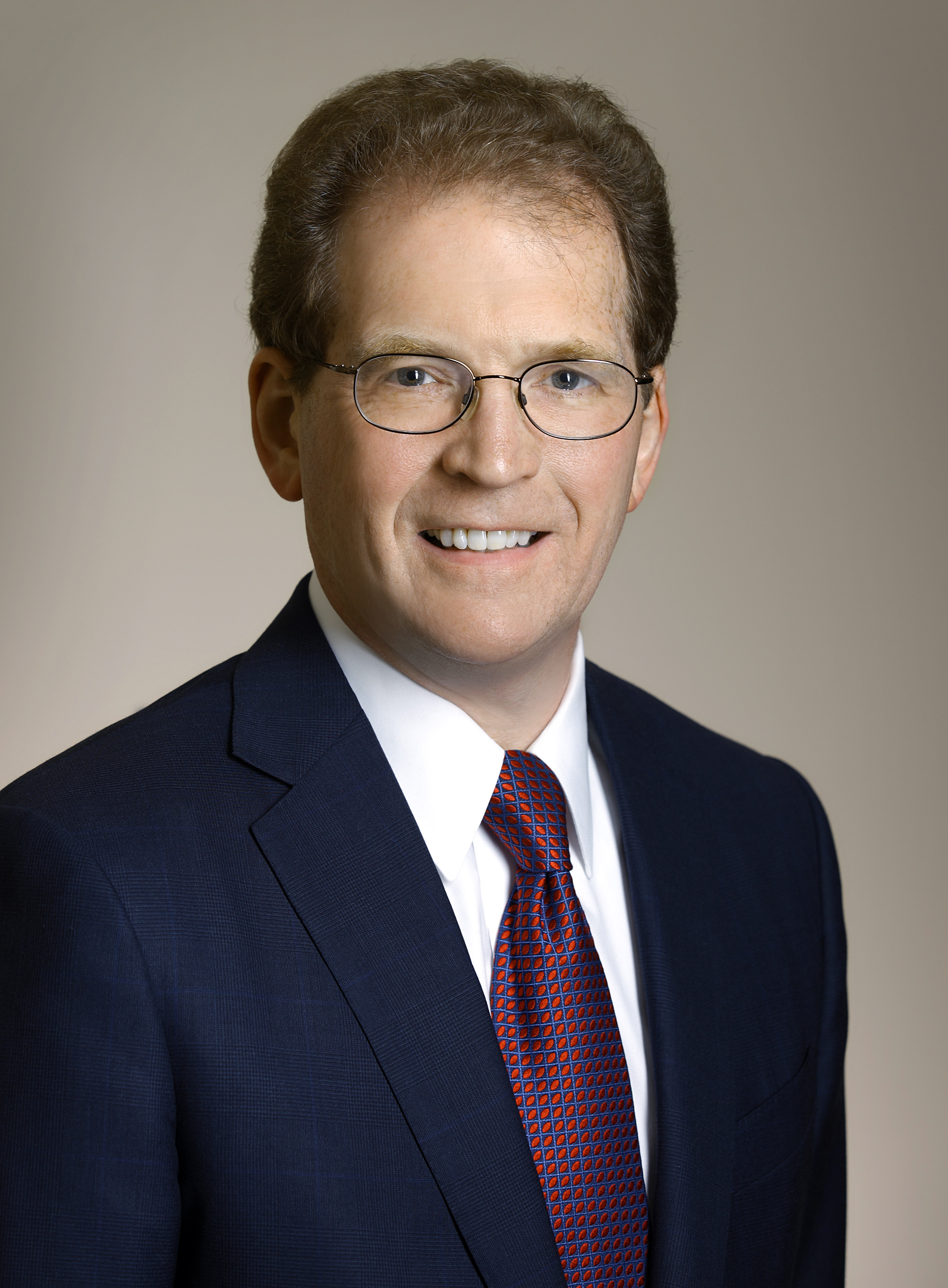

Dean of the Stanford University School of Medicine
- Incumbent
- Assumed office December 2012

13th Provost of Johns Hopkins University
- In office September 2009 – August 2012

Personal details
- Born: 1957 (age 68–69) Little Rock, Arkansas, U.S.
- Spouse: Lisa Ann Keamy
- Education: Brown University (BS, MD)
- Website: Office of the Dean, Stanford University School of Medicine

Lloyd Brooks Minor (born 1957) is an American surgeon, researcher, educator, and academic administrator. Since December 2012, he has served as the Carl and Elizabeth Naumann Dean of Stanford University School of Medicine at Stanford University. Previously, he was the provost of Johns Hopkins University.

An expert on the inner ear, Minor is known for identifying the superior canal dehiscence syndrome, a disorder where a hole in the skull bone upsets the inner ear balance canal. For refining a treatment for Ménière's disease using gentamicin, Minor received the Prosper Ménière Society's gold medal in 2010. A fellow of the American College of Surgeons and the American Academy of Otolaryngology – Head and Neck Surgery, he is also a member of the National Academy of Medicine.

== Early life and education ==
Minor was born in Little Rock, Arkansas, in 1957. His father was an accountant and his mother worked as a kindergarten teacher. He graduated from Brown University with a Bachelor of Science in biology in 1979 and received his M.D. from its Warren Alpert Medical School in 1982.

Minor completed his initial residency training in surgery at Duke University Medical Center from 1982 until 1984. From 1984 until 1988, he was a research fellow in vestibular neurophysiology at the University of Chicago Department of Pharmacological and Physiological Sciences, under the supervision of Jay M. Goldberg. From 1988 until 1992 he was a resident in otolaryngology at the University of Chicago Medical Center. From 1992 to 1993, Minor completed a clinical fellowship in otology and neurotology at The Otology Group and The EAR Foundation in Nashville, Tennessee.

== Career ==
=== Johns Hopkins University ===
In 1993 Minor joined the faculty of the Johns Hopkins University School of Medicine as an assistant professor of laryngology and otology. He became an associate professor in 1997 and a professor in 2001 in the departments of otolaryngology–head and neck surgery, neuroscience, and biomedical engineering. In 2003 Minor was appointed the Andelot Professor and director (chair) of the Department of Otolaryngology–Head and Neck Surgery and otolaryngologist-in-chief at Johns Hopkins Hospital. During his six years as department chair, Minor expanded annual research funding by more than 50 percent and increased clinical activity by more than 30 percent. During his tenure, the department was ranked number one by U.S. News & World Report's Best Hospital rankings by specialties.

On September 1, 2009 Minor became provost of Johns Hopkins University, making him both chief academic officer and the second-ranking member of the administration. He also served as University Distinguished Service Professor in the Department of Otolaryngology–Head and Neck Surgery from 2009 until 2012, while remaining a professor in the departments of biomedical engineering and neuroscience. During his tenure as provost, Minor launched a number of university-wide initiatives, among them the Gateway Sciences Initiative to increase innovation in teaching, and the Doctor of Philosophy Board to encourage quality education on the doctoral level. He helped coordinate the Individualized Health Initiative, which aims to use genetic information to improve health care, and worked to improve recruitment and retention of faculty.

=== Stanford University ===
Minor has been dean of Stanford University School of Medicine since December 1, 2012. His role as dean gives him oversight for Stanford Medicine's clinical enterprise (Stanford Health Care and Lucile Packard Children's Hospital), and also gives him oversight for Stanford Medicine's clinical enterprise strategy. He also has oversight of the physicians chosen to serve on the faculty and in Stanford Medicine's clinical network. At Stanford University, Minor also serves by courtesy as a professor of otolaryngology (head and neck surgery), bioengineering, and neurobiology.

Minor has used his position as Dean to push for Stanford Medicine to focus on "precision health", which is intended to tailor care to patients' individual variations. He has written about precision health in op-eds for publications such as The Wall Street Journal and Forbes. Minor espouses it as both a form of treatment and preventive medicine that is focused on prediction by accounting for factors such as behavior and socioeconomic conditions. Working across Stanford Medicine and Stanford University, Minor also oversaw the development and implementation of a new cancer research and care model, and launched an initiative concerning biomedical big data and a health care system with learning capabilities. He was re-appointed the dean in March 2017, to a second five-year term.

Concerning grants and finances, at Stanford Minor has supported competitive innovation grants that back basic science research, also increasing support for other core areas and resources. In particular, he expanded clinical and patient-centered research, helped support new educational models, and supported financial assistance covering students' first four years of Ph.D. training. He furthermore worked to cut down on financial barriers for students," increased faculty development programs and leadership options, and pushed for programming with diversity and "accountability". Between 2012 and 2016, Stanford credited Minor with helping raise the number underrepresented minority students from 10% of incoming graduate students to 28%. In 2017, he introduced the Health Trends Report published by Stanford Medicine, with research and reviews on emerging trends in health care.

== Scientific research ==
Minor is an expert in balance and inner ear disorders, and since 1980 he has published over 140 articles and chapters. He published four key studies between 1999 and 2001 articulating the connection between head motion and eye movements and how they are controlled by the balancing mechanisms centered in the inner ear. Through neurophysiological investigations of eye movements and neuronal pathways, Minor has identified adaptive mechanisms responsible for compensation to vestibular injury in a model system for studies of motor learning (the vestibulo-ocular reflex). By 2010, synergies between this basic research and clinical studies have led to improved methods for the diagnosis and treatment of balance disorders.

In 1995 Minor discovered superior canal dehiscence syndrome, a debilitating disorder characterized by sound- or pressure-induced dizziness. Key to this discovery was Minor's finding that the eye movements evoked by sound and pressure stimuli in patients with superior canal dehiscence syndrome often align with the plane of the superior canal. He and his colleagues publicly published the findings on superior canal dehiscence syndrome for the first time in Archives of Otolaryngology–Head & Neck Surgery in 1998, describing clinical manifestations of the syndrome and relating its cause to an opening (dehiscence) in the bone covering the superior canal. In addition to describing the syndrome, he also later developed a surgical procedure that corrects the problem and alleviates symptoms.

== Organizations ==
He is a fellow of the American College of Surgeons and the American Academy of Otolaryngology – Head and Neck Surgery. Before that, he had been president of the Association for Research in Otolaryngology and chair of the Auditory Research Study Section of the National Institutes of Health. In 2012 Minor was elected to the National Academy of Medicine.

== Awards ==
In recognition of his work in refining a treatment for Ménière's disease using gentamicin, Minor received the Prosper Ménière Society's gold medal in 2010. In 2015 he also won the Joseph Toynbee Memorial Medal from the Royal Society of Medicine and Royal College of Surgeons.

== Personal life ==
Minor is married to Lisa Ann Keamy, a family practice physician. They have two children.
