= List of exoplanets discovered in 2024 =

This list of exoplanets discovered in 2024 is a list of confirmed exoplanets that were first reported in 2024. For exoplanets detected only by radial velocity, the listed value for mass is a lower limit. See Minimum mass for more information.

== List ==
Name	Mass (M_{J})	Radius (R_{J})	Period (days)	Semi-major axis (AU)	Temp. (K)	Discovery method	Distance (ly)	Host star mass (M_{☉})	Host star temp. (K)	Remarks
20 Leonis Minoris b	0.02882^{+0.00173}_{−0.00176}		31.15	0.1916±0.0007		radial vel.	48.64±0.07	0.967±0.01	5610±46	
82 G. Eridani d	0.01831±0.00179		647.6^{+2.5}_{−2.7}	1.354±0.007		radial vel.	19.7	0.813^{+0.018}_{−0.012}	5490±70	Orbiting within the habitable zone of its host star.
2MASS J05581644–4501559 b	6–12			1043		imaging	94.5	0.259±0.02	3218±158	
Barnard's Star b	0.00116±0.00016		3.153	0.0229	~400	radial vel.	5.9629±0.0004	0.162±0.007	3195±28	The closest exoplanet around a solitary star. Also located in the second closest star system to the Sun, after Alpha Centauri. Not to be confused with the disproved planet Barnard's Star b of 2018, which shared the same name.
BD+00 444b	0.0151±0.0035	0.2108±0.0059	15.669	0.105±0.025	519±6	transit	77.99±0.036	0.642±0.026	4375±65	
BD-10 47 b	0.0133±0.005	0.1529±0.0007	13.476	0.0943±0.0016	493±12	transit	65.89	0.616±0.032	4026±14	Also known as TOI-260 b
BD-14 3065 b	12.11^{+0.95}_{−0.91}	1.926±0.094	4.3	0.0646±0.0026	3520±130	transit	1847.4 (Note: Distance calculated from parallax)	1.4±0.06	6985±90	Located in a triple star system. It orbits the primary component of the system (BD-14 3065 A), a subgiant star. Also known as TOI-4987 b
BX Trianguli b	7.5		3923	4.5		timing	192±7	0.858 (combined)	3735 + 3359	
CI Tauri c	3.6±0.3		25.2±1.8	0.17		radial vel.	522.6±1.3	0.9±0.02	4250±50	Highly eccentric orbit (e = 0.58). Cited as confirmed by NASA Exoplanet Archive and exoplanet.eu.
CWISE J054129.32–745021.5 b	1.8			6576		imaging	111			Orbits a young red dwarf.
Gaia-4 b	11.8^{+0.73}_{−0.66}		571.3^{+1.4}_{−1.3}			astrometry + radial vel.	239.2±0.4	0.644^{+0.025}_{−0.023}	4034±77	
Gaia20eae b	6			0.062		episodic accretion outbursts	9226^{+3130}_{−2021}	1.15	4330±300	
Gaia22dkvLb	0.15 to 5.67^{+0.39}_{−0.38}		219^{+47}_{−29} to 964+99 −106	0.48^{+0.01}_{−0.07} to 2.08^{+0.16}_{−0.18}		microlensing	3097±130 to 5477^{+326}_{−391}	0.219^{+0.056}_{−0.039} to 1.3^{+0.04}_{−0.05}		
Gliese 12 b	0.002769^{+0.00123}_{−0.0008}	0.0892±0.0089 (Note: The radius is the same as that of the Earth, with an uncertainty of 10%)	12.7	0.066±0.002	315±5	transit	39.65	0.241±0.006	3253±55	
Gliese 238 b		0.05049±0.0012	1.74	0.02123^{+0.00016}_{−0.00017}	758^{+16}_{−15}	transit	49.6	0.419±0.01	3485±140	Mars-sized exoplanet, one of the smallest exoplanets currently known
Gliese 341 b	0.00227±0.00044	0.0821±0.045	7.577		540	transit	33.9	0.506	3745	Also known as TOI-741 b
Gliese 900 b	10.5		460,000,000	12,000		imaging	68	1.08 (combined)	3976	Located in a three-star system. It has the longest orbital time of any exoplanet so far at 1.26 million years.
Gliese 1289 b	0.01655^{+0.002958}_{−0.003052}		111.74	0.27±0.01	150	radial vel.	28.88	0.21±0.02	3296±30	
Gliese 4256 b	0.00453±0.00044	0.0962±0.0058	0.238	0.0054	1340±60	transit	66.46±0.03	0.353±0.015	3421±70	An ultra-short period planet orbiting close to the host star's Roche limit. It is expected to undergo tidal disruption in the next hundred million years. Also known as TOI-6255 b
HD 21520 b	0.02486^{+0.01007}_{−0.00944}	0.2409±0.008	25.13	0.1726±0.0071	637^{+13}_{−12}	transit	258	1.09±0.07	5871±62	
HD 28185 c	5.68^{+0.44}_{−0.36}		9224^{+332}_{−223}	8.54^{+0.21}_{−0.14}		astrometry + radial vel.	127.8±0.1	0.974±0.018	5602±36	Already known to exist in 2022, but was found to be an exoplanet—as opposed to a brown dwarf, in 2024.
HD 48948 b	0.0154±0.000661		7.34013±0.00040	0.0652±0.0005	715±10	radial vel.	54.915±0.0228	0.686^{+0.020}_{−0.013}	4593±60	
HD 48948 c	0.0229±0.00220		37.920^{+0.026}_{−0.024}	0.1951±0.0016	413±6	radial vel.	54.915±0.0228	0.686^{+0.020}_{−0.013}	4593±60	
HD 48948 d	0.0333±0.00315		150.95^{+0.45}_{−0.41}	0.4894±0.0042	262±4	radial vel.	54.915±0.0228	0.686^{+0.020}_{−0.013}	4593±60	Closest Super Earth in habitable zone around a K-dwarf star.
HD 57625 b	8.43^{+1.10}_{−0.91}		4843^{+306}_{−167}	5.70^{+0.14}_{−0.13}		radial vel. + astrometry	144.3	1.040^{+0.078}_{−0.080}	5962±43	True mass revealed using astrometry.
HD 63433 d		0.09573±0.0141	4.21	0.0503±0.0027	1040±40	transit	71.7	0.99±0.03	5688±28	Hot Earth-sized exoplanet
HD 73344 b	0.00939^{+0.00787}_{−0.00599}	0.2573^{+0.0073}_{−0.0064}	15.6	0.131	911±7	transit	114.7^{+0.1}_{−0.0}	1.20±0.02	6028±110	The dayside temperature can be as high as 1,066 K if the planet is tidally locked.
HD 73344 c	0.367^{+0.022}_{−0.021}		65.936	0.3388^{+0.0042}_{−0.0043}	562±4	radial vel.	114.7^{+0.1}_{−0.0}	1.20±0.02	6028±110	
HD 73344 d	2.55^{+0.56}_{−0.46}		5746^{+120}_{−150}	6.70^{+0.25}_{−0.26}		radial vel.	114.7^{+0.1}_{−0.0}	1.20±0.02	6028±110	True mass revealed using astrometry.
HD 75898 c	8.49^{+0.65}_{−0.63}		6717±40	7.39±0.05		astrometry + radial vel.	263	1.295±0.015	6122±52	
HD 77946 b	0.02637±0.00415	0.24133^{+0.00767}_{−0.0071}	6.527	0.072±0.0012	1248^{+40}_{−38}	transit	322.7±1	1.17±0.06	6046.0±50.0	Also known as TOI-1778 b
HD 101581 b		0.0877	4.47			transit	41.7	0.740±0.087	4675±53	Host star is the brightest star with multiple known transiting Earth-size exoplanets. Another transiting planet in the system is suspected.
HD 101581 c		0.0925	6.21			transit	41.7	0.740±0.087	4675±53	Host star is the brightest star with multiple known transiting Earth-size exoplanets. Another transiting planet in the system is suspected.
HD 104067 c	0.0415		13.8992^{+0.0047}_{−0.0037}	0.1058±0.0013		radial vel.	66.34±0.03	0.82±0.03	4952±100	
HD 111520 b	≥1		1,285,900	≥200		disk kinematics	352.6±0.7	1.350±0.215	6542±131	
HD 115587 b	0.7	0.49	372			transit	356.2±0.5	1.248±0.190	6324±129	
HD 118203 c	11.1^{+1.3}_{−1}		5070	6.2±0.2	146±3	astrometry + radial vel.	300±0.5	1.353±0.006	5872±20	
HD 128717 b	12.8		1089.2	2.18		astrometry	240±0.5	1.17^{+0.06}_{−0.16}	6158±115	
HD 134606 e	0.00726^{+0.00113}_{−0.0011}		4.32	0.0527±0.0012		radial vel.	87.4±0.068	1.046^{+0.07}_{−0.059}	5576^{+86}_{−85}	
HD 134606 f	0.01737^{+0.00232}_{−0.00229}		26.915	0.1784±0.004		radial vel.	87.4±0.068	1.046^{+0.07}_{−0.059}	5576^{+86}_{−85}	
HD 148193 Ab	0.0894±0.0135	0.7476±0.017	20.38	0.1577		transit	626±3	1.261±0.183	6351±119	The host star is orbited by two red dwarfs 157 and 1950 AU away. Also known as TOI-1836 Ab
HD 148193 Ac	0.025	0.232^{+0.01972}_{−0.01285}	1.773	0.03089±0.0005	2007.6^{+35.85}_{−29}	transit	626±3	1.261±0.183	6351±119	Also known as TOI-1836 Ac
HD 156141 b	0.0305±0.0060	0.211±0.005	21.269	0.154±0.003	694.1^{+11.2}_{−11.0}	transit	237.726^{+0.390}_{−0.389}	1.09^{+0.034}_{−0.033}	5814±137	Also known as TOI-1742 b.
HD 222237 b	5.19±0.58		14,890^{+2120}_{−1643}	10.8^{+1.1}_{−1.0}		astrometry + radial vel.	37.31±0.0	0.76±0.09	4751±139	
HD 278878 b	0.6963±0.0242	0.9225±0.0571	8.71	0.08258		transit	520.8±4.9	0.989±0.126	5597±147	
HIP 11696 b	4 to 16			2.5 to 28		astrometry	160.8	1.40±0.07	6298	
HIP 39017 b	23.6^{+9.1}_{−7.4}	0.87	30681^{+18627.8}_{−9496.5}	22.1^{+8.0}_{−4.9}		imaging	214.9±0.3	1.52^{+0.28}_{−0.26}	7201^{+142}_{−112}	May be a brown dwarf. Estimates of the mass vary from 13.8 M_{J} to 30+31 −12 M_{J}.
HIP 47110 b	3 to 10			3 to 30		astrometry	126.2	0.98±0.05	4529	
HIP 67522 c		0.731^{+0.055}_{−0.057}	14.335	0.1235	915^{+22}_{−19}	transit	414	1.2±0.05	5675±75	
HS Piscium b	1.44^{+0.56}_{−0.44}		3.986	0.0435±0.0017		radial vel.	122.79^{+0.12}_{−0.14}	0.69±0.07	4203±116	
IRAS 04125+2902 b	0.3	0.955	8.83			transit	520	0.7	3720	The youngest transiting exoplanet discovered to date.
Kepler-51e	0.01572		260			timing	2610±50	1.04	6018	Assuming the 2:1 resonance solution, which is the best-fit one, Kepler-51e has a mass of about 5 M_{🜨} and a period of 260 days.
Kepler-158d		0.038±0.004	0.645088±0.000002			transit	1028±7	0.656^{+0.073}_{−0.049}	4895.97	
Kepler-879c		0.04±0.01	0.646716±0.000003			transit	2618^{+36}_{−35}	0.974^{+0.127}_{−0.104}	5456.75	
Kepler-963c		0.05±0.02	0.919783±0.000003			transit	2516^{+42}_{−40}	0.821^{+0.120}_{−0.065}	5169.47	
Kepler-1489c		0.045±0.007	0.680741±0.000004			transit	4185^{+118}_{−111}	0.977^{+0.050}_{−0.062}	5565.53	
Kepler-2003b		0.06±0.01	0.941967±0.000003			transit	3054^{+85}_{−81}	0.859^{+0.126}_{−0.065}	5050.28	Also known as KOI-4978 b.
K2-360 c	0.0479±0.0024		9.797±0.030	0.0883±0.0016	912±18	radial vel.	762.59±19.05	0.958±0.048	5679^{+60}_{−39}	
K2-419 Ab	0.617±0.047	0.941±0.034	20.358	0.1208^{+0.0016}_{−0.0017}	377±11	transit	860±8	0.562±0.024	3711±88	
KMT-2016-BLG-2321Lb	3.58±1.22			3.58±0.81		microlensing	11,670±3980	0.73±0.28		
KMT-2017-BLG-0849Lb	0.0201^{+0.0245}_{−0.0097}			2.73^{+0.68}_{−0.62}		microlensing	23,540^{+2670}_{−3220}	0.19^{+0.23}_{−0.09}		
KMT-2017-BLG-1057Lb	0.0739^{+0.0472}_{−0.0378}			2.36^{+0.69}_{−0.62}		microlensing	21,190^{+2640}_{−5280}	0.57^{+0.37}_{−0.29}		
KMT-2017-BLG-2331Lb	0.538^{+0.431}_{−0.277}			2.14^{+0.48}_{−0.42}		microlensing	26,180^{+2740}_{−3420}	0.4^{+0.32}_{−0.21}		
KMT-2020-BLG-0157Lb	10.71^{+6.17}_{−5.61}			11.54^{+1.61}_{−2.25}		microlensing	21,744^{+3032}_{−4238}	0.58^{+0.33}_{−0.30}		
KMT-2021-BLG-2609Lb	0.032^{+0.044}_{−0.018} or 0.112^{+0.152}_{−0.061}			2.30^{+0.32}_{−0.36}		microlensing	24,380^{+3420}_{−3810}	0.20^{+0.27}_{−0.11}		
KMT-2022-BLG-0303Lb	0.513^{+0.410}_{−0.275}			4.81^{+0.65}_{−0.76}		microlensing	21,400^{+2900}_{−3400}	0.368^{+0.294}_{−0.197}		
KMT-2022-BLG-0732Lb	1.12±0.65			4.11^{+0.74}_{−1.14}		microlensing	21,712^{+3879}_{−6000}	0.54±0.31		
KMT-2022-BLG-1787Lb	6.64^{+4.98}_{−3.64}			6.3^{+0.75}_{−1.08}		microlensing	24,613^{+2901}_{−4038}	0.42^{+0.32}_{−0.23}		
KMT-2022-BLG-1852Lb	4.98^{+5.42}_{−2.94}			5.03^{+0.72}_{−0.92}		microlensing	20,440^{+2934}_{−3749}	0.32^{+0.34}_{−0.19}		
KMT-2023-BLG-0416Lb	6.15^{+3.03}_{−3.2}			3.73^{+0.56}_{−0.8}		microlensing	20,640^{+3100}_{−4400}	0.61^{+0.3}_{−0.32}		The mass of the planet can be as low as 0.042+0.021 −0.022 M_{J}.
KMT-2023-BLG-0469Lb	0.124^{+0.092}_{−0.067}			2.37±0.9		microlensing	23,050^{+3260}_{−3910}	0.47±0.36		
KMT-2023-BLG-0735Lb	0.12±0.07			2.75±1		microlensing	20,830^{+3910}_{−3260}	0.61±0.34		
KMT-2023-BLG-1431Lb	0.0428^{+0.0261}_{−0.0217}			2.3±0.5 or 3.2^{+0.7}_{−0.8}		microlensing	22,500^{+2610}_{−5540}	0.57^{+0.33}_{−0.29}		
KMT-2023-BLG-1454Lb	0.63^{+0.71}_{−0.34}			1.18^{+0.17}_{−0.18}		microlensing	23,540^{+3460}_{−3590}	0.17^{+0.19}_{−0.09}		Estimates of the planet's mass varies between 0.3+0.34 −0.16 M_{J} and 0.77+0.87 −0.42 M_{J}
KMT-2023-BLG-1642Lb	1.08^{+1.53}_{−0.58}			1.41^{+0.22}_{−0.27}		microlensing	22,750^{+3550}_{−4370}	0.17^{+0.24}_{−0.09}		
KMT-2023-BLG-1866Lb	0.00828^{+0.00132}_{−0.00214}			2.63^{+0.37}_{−0.34}		microlensing	20,240^{+2840}_{−1100}	0.51^{+0.08}_{−0.13}		Super-Earth planet detected by microlensing.
KMT-2023-BLG-2669	0.02517					microlensing				Candidate rogue planet. Might have a mass ranging from sub-Neptune to Saturn-mass, depending on its distance.
KMT-2024-BLG-1044L	0.0244^{+0.0378}_{−0.0127} or 0.0430^{+0.0479}_{−0.0211}					microlensing	21,900^{+3200}_{−3400} or 23,300±3100	0.069^{+0.080}_{−0.036} or 0.131^{+0.146}_{−0.064}		Host star is either a brown dwarf or a red dwarf.
LHS 1678 d	0.00289^{+0.00208}_{−0.00107}	0.08752±0.0062	4.965	0.04^{+0.0018}_{−0.0017}		transit	65	0.345±0.014	3490±50	
M62H b	2.83	<0.683 (Note: Radius calculated with mass and lower limit in density in the equation d=(1.89813*10^(30)*m)/((4/3)*π*r^{3}), where d is density (in g/cm^{3}), m is the mass (in M_{J} and r is the radius (in centimeters). Should be divided by 7.1492×10^{9} to convert from centimeters to R_{J}) (Note: Since the density is only a lower limit, the radius is an upper limit.)	0.133	0.004908		timing	21,500	1.4		Pulsar planet located in the globular cluster Messier 62. Second shortest orbit of any confirmed exoplanet after PSR J1719-1438 b.
MOA-2011-BLG-262Lb	0.056634			0.98 ^{+0.56}_{−0.20}		microlensing	22830	0.193 ± 0.029	3300	Once considered as either exomoon or exoplanet, the latter scenario was confirmed in 2024 based on observations of the host star by the Keck telescope. Has the highest transverse velocity of 541.3±65.75 km/s.
MOA-2016-BLG-526Lb	6.93±0.75			2.07±0.35		microlensing	22,490	0.4		
MOA-2022-BLG-563Lb	0.4^{+0.31}_{−0.25}			2.25±0.25		microlensing	21,290^{+3650}_{−5220}	0.48^{+0.36}_{−0.3}		
NGTS-26 b	0.29^{+0.07}_{−0.06}	1.33^{+0.06}_{−0.05}	4.52	0.0490^{+0.0038}_{−0.0032}	1331^{+85}_{−72}	transit	3610±100	0.96^{+0.04}_{−0.03}	5550±100	Highly inflated planet (density = 0.153 g/cm^{3})
NGTS-27 b	0.593^{+0.095}_{−0.072}	1.396^{+0.038}_{−0.035}	3.37	0.0446^{+0.0026}_{−0.0036}	1783^{+104}_{−88}	transit	3185±55	1.07±0.06	5700±80	
NGTS-29 b	0.393	0.857	69.33	0.347	414	transit	487±1	1.034±0.032	5730±80	
NGTS-30 b	0.96	0.93	98.3	0.408	390	transit	762.5	0.94	5455	Also known as TOI-4862 b
NGTS-31 b	1.12±0.12	1.61±0.16	4.162734±0.000004	0.064±0.008	1410±20	transit	2780^{+323}_{−326}	0.96^{+0.11}_{−0.05}	5710±70	
NGTS-32 b	0.57±0.05	1.42±0.03	3.31211±0.00002	0.044±0.001	1750±20	transit	2760^{+33}_{−23}	1.07^{+0.06}_{−0.04}	5680±60	
NGTS-33 b	3.6±0.3	1.64±0.07	2.828	0.048±0.02	1991±21	transit	1430±23	1.60±0.11	7437±72	
OGLE-2014-BLG-0221Lb	4.35^{+1.65}_{−1.91}			3.76^{+0.96}_{−1.07}		microlensing	12,000^{+3690}_{−3780}	0.69^{+0.26}_{−0.30}		
OGLE-2015-BLG-1609Lb	0.0059^{+0.0122}_{−0.0031} to ^{+0.24}_{−0.90}					microlensing	10,100^{+8500}_{−6800}	0.025^{+0.050}_{−0.012} to 0.17^{+0.63}_{−0.12}		
OGLE-2016-BLG-1598Lb	5.91±1.74			2.5±0.88		microlensing	19,270±5670	0.55±0.32		
OGLE-2016-BLG-1800Lb	2.59±1.46			1.88±0.51		microlensing	21,100±3360	0.41±0.22		
OGLE-2017-BLG-0364Lb	0.0642^{+0.106}_{−0.034} to 0.805^{+0.554}_{−0.437}			1.27^{+0.49}_{−0.3}		microlensing	22,300 to 29,300	0.1^{+0.16}_{−0.05} to 0.55^{+0.38}_{−0.3}		Assuming the largest distance, it would be the most distant confirmed exoplanet, surpassing SWEEPS-04/11.
OGLE-2017-BLG-0380Lb A	10.5					microlensing	6,980			A pair of rogue planets.
OGLE-2017-BLG-0380Lb B	3.08					microlensing	6,980			A pair of rogue planets.
OGLE-2017-BLG-0640Lb	1.62^{+1.64}_{−0.94}			1.14±0.38		microlensing	21,600^{+3550}_{−4730}	0.32^{+0.32}_{−0.18}		
OGLE-2017-BLG-1237Lb	3.8^{+2.49}_{−1.99}			2.53^{+0.5}_{−0.64}		microlensing	19,660^{+3060}_{−4990}	0.46^{+0.3}_{−0.24}		
OGLE-2017-BLG-1275Lb	5.9±2.2			1.19±0.36		microlensing	25,070±2930	0.63±0.23		Another solution suggests a larger semi-major axis, of 2.09±0.63 AU.
OGLE-2023-BLG-0836Lb	4.36^{+2.35}_{−2.2}			3.7^{+1}_{−1.2}		microlensing	16,690^{+4430}_{−5250}	(Note: The planet is located in a two-star system, with masses of 0.78+0.38 −0.36 M_{☉} and 0.56+0.3 −0.28 M_{☉}. There is a large chance that it is orbiting both stars in the system, so the "host star mass" would be 0.78+0.38 −0.36 M_{☉} + 0.56+0.3 −0.28 M_{☉}. However, there is a small chance that is orbiting only one of the stars in the system.)		The planet is located in a binary star system, and is likely to be orbiting both stars in the system.
S1429 b	1.8±0.2		77.51±0.2	0.384±0.4	683±9	radial vel.	2836±26	1.26±0.04	6000±40	Located in the open cluster Messier 67.
SPECULOOS-3 b		0.08716	0.719	0.00733	553	transit	57.9	0.1	2800	Ultra-short period planet
Struve 2398 Ab	0.00875±0.0011	0.107–0.178	11.2201±0.0051	0.068±0.001		radial vel.	11.4	0.330±0.008	3470±31	
Teegarden's Star d	0.00258±0.00053		26.13	0.0791 ±0.0027	159±3	radial vel.	12.5	0.097±0.01	3034±45	Orbits beyond the habitable zone of its star. Another planet in the system is suspected.
TIC 4672985 b	12.74±1.01	1.026^{+0.065}_{−0.067}	69.05	0.33±0.019	517.2^{+11.3}_{−11.2}	transit	823.4	1.01±0.03	5757^{+72}_{−65}	
TIC 46432937 b	3.2±0.11	1.188±0.03	1.44	0.1951±0.0051	872±14	transit	295.5±0.3	0.563±0.029	3572±57	
TIC 139270665 b	0.463	0.645	23.624	0.163	700	transit	618	1.035^{+0.052}_{−0.062}	5844^{+84}_{−82}	
TIC 139270665 c	4.89^{+0.66}_{−0.37}		1010^{+780}_{−220}	2^{+0.93}_{−0.31}	200^{+18}_{−35}	radial vel.	618	1.035^{+0.052}_{−0.062}	5844^{+84}_{−82}	
TIC 241249530 b	4.98^{+0.16}_{−0.18}	1.19±0.04	165.772			transit	1058±12	1.271^{+0.061}_{−0.068}	6139±103	A planet on a highly-eccentric (e=0.94) and retrograde orbit.
TIC 393818343 b	4.34±0.15	1.087^{+0.023}_{−0.021}	16.25	0.129±0.002	805.5^{+9.6}_{−9.4}	transit	306.3±1.1	1.082^{+0.055}_{−0.056}	5756^{+57}_{−66}	Highly eccentric orbit (e=0.6058); Also known as TOI-6883 b
TIC 393818343 c	0.357±0.132	0.792±0.018	7.8458±0.0023	0.079±0.011	1027.2089± 0.3717	transit	306.3±1.1	1.082^{+0.055}_{−0.056}	5756^{+57}_{−66}	
TIC 434398831 b		0.3131^{+0.0196}_{−0.0187}	3.6855	0.04641±0.00017	1250±11	transit	698±6	0.992^{+0.014}_{−0.018}	5638±50	Young exoplanet located in the Theia 116 association.
TIC 434398831 c		0.5023^{+0.0259}_{−0.025}	6.21	0.06572±0.00024	1050±10	transit	698±6	0.992^{+0.014}_{−0.018}	5638±50	Young exoplanet located in the Theia 116 association.
TOI-128 b		0.198	4.94	0.054	1345	transit	222.5±0.2	0.85	6086	
TOI-238 c	0.0211±0.0035	0.1945±0.0161	8.466	0.0749±0.0013	696±15	transit	261.328±0.312	0.79±0.022	5059±89	
TOI-286 b	0.01425±0.00245	0.1267±0.0089	4.512	0.0503±0.001	979±31	transit	193	0.832±0.049	5152±12	There are three available models to explain the disagreement between the radial velocity and transit measurements. (Note: The transit observations of TOI-286 indicate periodic transit signals of 4.5 and 39.4 days. While this, radial velocity measurements with ESPRESSO do not immediately show evidence for periodic signals at either periods.)
TOI-286 c	0.01171±0.00698	0.1677±0.0107	39.36	0.213±0.004	475±15	transit	193	0.832±0.049	5152±12	
TOI-329 b	0.1271		5.71	0.064		transit	927.1	0.98	5560	Radius of the host star is significantly larger compared to mass (1.61 R_{☉})
TOI-406 b	0.00654^{+0.00072}_{−0.00069}	0.1178±0.0107	3.307	0.0322±0.0013	584±22	transit	101±0.7	0.408^{+0.046}_{−0.042}	3392±44	
TOI-406 c	0.02067±0.003	0.1846±0.0143	13.18	0.0809±0.003	368±14	transit	101±0.7	0.408^{+0.046}_{−0.042}	3392±44	
TOI-429 b	0.8	0.8056±0.0196	338			transit	391.5±0.5	0.99±0.06	5245^{+25}_{−67}	
TOI-480 b	0.0654		6.866			transit	177.8	1.2	6212	
TOI-588 b		1.459±0.036	39.4718		1015	transit	502.9±3.2	2.69^{+0.34}_{−0.36}	10,416^{+254}_{−220}	
TOI-603 b	0.1495±0.0431	0.7075±0.018	16.18	0.1281		transit	671.3±5.15	1.072±0.136	5901±130	
TOI-654 b		0.211	1.53	0.021	749	transit	188.7±0.18	0.53	3433	
TOI-663 b	0.0140±0.00204	0.203±0.00892	2.599	0.0295±0.0011	674±30	transit	209.490±0.587	0.514±0.012	3681±70	
TOI-663 c	0.0115±0.00305	0.202±0.00892	4.696	0.0437±0.0016	553±24	transit	209.490±0.587	0.514±0.012	3681±70	
TOI-663 d	<0.0164	0.171±0.0116	7.103	0.0576^{+0.0021}_{−0.0022}	482±21	transit	209.490±0.587	0.514±0.012	3681±70	
TOI-694 b		1.146±0.056	48.05		479.8	transit	730.2^{+4.1}_{−4.0}	1.042^{+0.063}_{−0.038}	5355^{+74}_{−140}	
TOI-710 b		1.66±1.10	72.08			transit	514±2	1.71^{+0.39}_{−0.19}	7458^{+146}_{−123}	
TOI-757 b	0.033±0.007	0.223±0.001	17.468	0.122±0.002	641±10	transit	196.9^{+1}_{−0.7}	0.8±0.04	5278±63	
TOI-762 Ab	0.251±0.042	0.744±0.017	3.472	0.03418	555±6	transit	322±0.7	0.442±0.025	3266±36	Located in a binary star system.
TOI-782 b	<0.06	0.244±0.008	8.024	0.0578±0.0018	398±6–435±6 (Note: Assuming albedos of 0.3 and 0 respectively.)	transit	170.2±0.2	0.397±0.01	3370^{+29}_{−32}	
TOI-815 b	0.0239±0.0047	0.2622±0.0044	11.197	0.0903^{+0.0018}_{−0.0019}	686^{+13}_{−14}	transit	193.76±0.15	0.776±0.036	4869±77	The host star is part of a binary star system with a red dwarf companion
TOI-815 c	0.0739±0.00755	0.2337^{+0.0089}_{−0.008}	34.976	0.193±0.004	469±9	transit	193.76±0.15	0.776±0.036	4869±77	The host star is part of a binary star system with a red dwarf companion
TOI-880 b		0.248	2.57	0.034	1163	transit	197.5±0.2	0.81	4935	
TOI-907 b		0.858	4.58	0.055	1847	transit	989.9±5.0	1.07	6272	
TOI-1011 b	0.01271±0.00186	0.1294±0.0045	2.47	0.0346		transit	170.8±0.1	0.92±0.03	5475±84	
TOI-1135 b	0.062^{+0.033}_{−0.031}	0.805±0.02	5.13±0.27	0.082±0.003	1198.9±21.3	transit	371.4±0.5	1.125±0.032	6122±25	
TOI-1173 Ab	0.08213±0.00598	0.723±0.015	7.064	0.0702±0.0012	863.9±9.8	transit	430.85	0.911^{+0.028}_{−0.03}	5350±340	Low-density planet located in a wide binary system.
TOI-1184 b	0.021±0.007	0.215^{+0.009}_{−0.013}	5.748	0.056±0.001	715.5^{+13.7}_{−14.1}	transit	191.110±0.254	0.73^{+0.024}_{−0.025}	4616±104	
TOI-1199 b	0.239±0.02	0.938±0.025	3.671	0.04988±0.0009	1486±20	transit	805±2.6	1.23±0.07	5710±40	
TOI-1224 b		0.1877^{+0.0084}_{−0.0081}	4.178	0.0355^{+0.0017}_{−0.0034}	541^{+26}_{−14}	transit	121.5	0.4±0.01	3326±66	Located in the MELANGE-5 association, which is 200 Myr old. The host star may be binary.
TOI-1224 c		0.2573±0.0087	17.945			transit	121.5	0.4±0.01	3326±66	Located in the MELANGE-5 association, which is 200 Myr old. The host star may be binary.
TOI-1248 b	0.0862^{+0.0113}_{−0.0110}	0.607^{+0.0104}_{−0.0107}	4.360	0.051±0.001	952.1^{+13.5}_{−14.3}	transit	550.340^{+1.963}_{−1.947}	0.90±0.03	5205±120	
TOI-1249 b	0.0374^{+0.0164}_{−0.0160}	0.2918^{+0.0274}_{−0.0167}	13.079	0.109±0.002	727^{+12}_{−11}	transit	455.0^{+1.8}_{−1.7}	0.952^{+0.167}_{−0.082}	5453^{+76}_{−160}	
TOI-1266 d	0.01158^{+0.00330}_{−0.00349}		32.5	0.1513±0.0024	288±5	radial vel. + timing	117.4±0.1	0.437±0.021	3563±77	
TOI-1269 b	0.020±0.009	0.2142^{+0.0134}_{−0.0066}	4.253	0.0496^{+0.0009}_{−0.0010}	1005^{+15}_{−14}	transit	561.4±2.3	0.969^{+0.154}_{−0.104}	5517^{+107}_{−143}	
TOI-1273 b	0.222±0.015	0.99±0.2	4.631	0.0549±0.001	1211±15	transit	574±1.3	1.06±0.06	5690±40	
TOI-1279 b	0.0334±0.0079	0.237^{+0.0123}_{−0.0095}	9.61419±0.00004	0.085±0.002	759^{+11.8}_{−11.7}	transit	349.167^{+0.933}_{−0.926}	0.88±0.03	5457±127	
TOI-1294 b	0.1957±0.016	0.8199±0.0277	3.915	0.0489		transit	1052±7	1.02±0.13	5714±126	
TOI-1294 c	0.467±0.053		160.1±2.5	0.581		radial vel.	1052±7	1.02±0.13	5714±126	
TOI-1295 b	1.42±0.08	1.40±0.08	3.197	0.047±0.002	2360±50	transit	1265±16	1.38±0.08	6280±50	
TOI-1347 b	0.0349±0.0038	0.161±0.009	0.847		1400±40	transit	480.8±2	0.913±0.033	5464±100	Ultra-short period planet
TOI-1347 c	0.0088±0.0072	0.143±0.009	4.842		1000±25	transit	480.8±2	0.913±0.033	5464±100	
TOI-1386 b	0.148^{+0.019}_{−0.018}	0.54^{+0.018}_{−0.016}	25.838	0.1732^{+0.0027}_{−0.0033}	676.4^{+10}_{−8.3}	transit	478.8±2.2	1.038^{+0.05}_{−0.058}	5793^{+76}_{−73}	
TOI-1386 c	0.309±0.038		227.6^{+4.6}_{−4}	0.739^{+0.015}_{−0.016}	327.4^{+5.3}_{−4.6}	radial vel.	478.8±2.2	1.038^{+0.05}_{−0.058}	5793^{+76}_{−73}	
TOI-1408 c	0.0239±0.0006	0.1981±0.0054	2.1664±0.0001	0.3587±0.0008		timing	435.6±0.7	1.31±0.01	6117±31	
TOI-1410 b		0.262	1.22	0.020	1396	transit	236.7±0.2	0.72	4635	
TOI-1437 b	0.0302^{+0.0123}_{−0.0104}	0.200^{+0.021}_{−0.020}	18.841	0.140^{+0.018}_{−0.017}	794±14	transit + radial vel.	336	1.10±0.10	6008±113	
TOI-1439 b	0.121±0.018	0.379^{+0.021}_{−0.015}	27.644	0.192±0.004	748.4^{+10.9}_{−13.1}	transit	751.158^{+7.691}_{−7.537}	1.24	5857±60	
TOI-1443 b	<0.0944	0.2055^{+0.0113}_{−0.0090}	23.541	0.147±0.003	521^{+14}_{−12}	transit	279.9±0.7	0.89^{+0.14}_{−0.09}	5236^{+111}_{−140}	
TOI-1448 b	<0.0613	0.245±0.006	8.112	0.0567±0.0015	389±5–426±6	transit	240±0.3	0.372±0.009	3412^{+28}_{−32}	
TOI-1450 Ab	0.00396±0.0004	0.1±0.004	2.04		722±35	transit	73.2±0.1	0.48±0.024	3437±86	Located in a binary star system. It is the second-lowest mass transiting planet with a high-precision mass measurement.
TOI-1450 Ac	0.0048±0.0006		5.07		533±26	radial vel.	73.2±0.1	0.48±0.024	3437±86	Located in a binary system, its true mass could be similar to the minimum mass assuming coplanarity with TOI-1450 Ab.
TOI-1451 b	0.0478±0.0088	0.233^{+0.0120}_{−0.0092}	16.538	0.127±0.003	723.3^{+12.4}_{−12.2}	transit	299.856^{+0.710}_{−0.707}	1.00^{+0.04}_{−0.03}	5800±139	
TOI-1472 b	0.0519±0.0160	0.371^{+0.0140}_{−0.0113}	6.36381±0.00091	0.065±0.001	811.1^{+11.2}_{−10.8}	transit	397.389^{+4.341}_{−4.250}	0.92±0.02	5103^{+119}_{−144}	
TOI-1669 b	<0.0409	0.2049^{+0.0091}_{−0.0080}	2.68	0.0376±0.0007	1285^{+22}_{−21}	transit	362.9±1.2	1.00±0.05	5542±100	
TOI-1683 b		0.236	3.06	0.037	929	transit	166.2±0.2	0.69	4402	
TOI-1691 b	0.0459^{+0.0170}_{−0.0167}	0.3181^{+0.0096}_{−0.0078}	16.737	0.126±0.003	703^{+13}_{−12}	transit	363.5±1.2	1.031^{+0.159}_{−0.127}	5759^{+209}_{−165}	
TOI-1723 b		0.2937^{+0.0127}_{−0.0114}	13.72641±0.00046	0.114±0.002	783^{+15}_{−14}	transit	328.5±1.0	1.035^{+0.147}_{−0.107}	5777^{+149}_{−101}	
TOI-1751 b	0.0538±0.0101	0.2489±0.0259	37.468	0.2115±0.0024	820	transit	370.3±0.3	1.15±0.17	6116±22	The host star is metal-poor ([Fe/H] = –0.40 dex).
TOI-1753 b	0.0522±0.0164	0.221^{+0.009}_{−0.007}	5.385	0.059±0.001	1005.4^{+18.3}_{−17.6}	transit	739.302^{+8.907}_{−8.699}	0.95±0.03	5620±134	
TOI-1758 b		0.3174^{+0.0203}_{−0.0127}	20.705	0.138±0.003	551^{+9}_{−8}	transit	315.1±1.1	0.88^{+0.12}_{−0.09}	5169^{+95}_{−148}	
TOI-1775 b	0.302±0.047	0.718^{+0.0128}_{−0.0114}	10.241	0.080±0.002	707.9^{+8.6}_{−8.3}	transit	486.736^{+3.108}_{−3.072}	0.92^{+0.01}_{−0.02}	5283±116	
TOI-1776 b		0.1085^{+0.0080}_{−0.0069}	2.8	0.0378^{+0.0007}_{−0.0008}	1269±21	transit	146	1.02^{+0.11}_{−0.14}	5724±105	
TOI-1798 b		0.126	0.44	0.011	2122	transit	369.147^{+1.008}_{−1.005}	0.86	5165	
TOI-1798 c	0.018^{+0.003}_{−0.002}	0.125^{+0.006}_{−0.005}	0.438	0.0107±0.0002	1935.8^{+25.2}_{−25.9}	transit	369.147^{+1.008}_{−1.005}	0.86	5165	
TOI-1799 b	0.013^{+0.005}_{−0.006}	0.1269^{+0.0932}_{−0.0880}	7.085738±0.000083	0.071±0.001	923^{+15}_{−14}	transit	203	1.01^{+0.14}_{−0.12}	5690^{+121}_{−124}	
TOI-1803 b	0.03241±0.00787	0.267±0.007	6.293287±0.000028	0.060±0.001	747±11	transit	388.3	0.756^{+0.050}_{−0.042}	4687±65	
TOI-1803 c	0.01794±0.00944	0.3738^{+0.0223}_{−0.0267}	12.885776±0.000036	0.097±0.002	561±10	transit	388.3	0.756^{+0.050}_{−0.042}	4687±65	
TOI-1806 b		0.304	15.15	0.088	337	transit	180.7±0.2	0.39	3272	
TOI-1823 b	0.212^{+0.025}_{−0.026}	0.673^{+0.030}_{−0.022}	38.80±0.01	0.212±0.004	423.6^{+10.4}_{−8.7}	transit	233.677^{+0.375}_{−0.374}	0.84±0.03	4926±113	
TOI-1824 b	0.0582±0.01	0.2346±0.0133	22.8	0.149±0.003	577±19	transit	192.3	0.85±0.05	5180±110	High-density planet, situated in the small group of "overdense sub-Neptunes". TOI-1824 has also a red dwarf companion named TIC 142387022.
TOI-1828 b	0.1841±0.012	0.769±0.017	9.09	0.0859		transit	1208±8	1.04±0.13	5809±127	
TOI-1855 b	1.133±0.096	1.65^{+0.52}_{−0.37}	1.364	0.02398^{+0.00037}_{−0.00036}	1700±20	transit + radial vel.	576.3±4.6	0.987^{+0.058}_{−0.045}	5359^{+89}_{−83}	
TOI-1883 b		0.4953±0.0460	4.506		524.9	transit	376±3	0.492±0.02	3477±157	
TOI-1885 b	1.624±0.103	1.219±0.037	6.544060±0.000006			transit	1826.773^{+21.464}_{−20.982}		6527±98	
TOI-1898 b	0.4059^{+0.0220}_{−0.0252}	0.838^{+0.021}_{−0.028}	45.52	0.269±0.005	674.5^{+11.6}_{−11.8}	transit	259.7±1.4	1.24^{+0.22}_{−0.16}	6304^{+139}_{−144}	
TOI-2019 b	0.109±0.0132	0.505±0.0250	15.3444±0.0055			transit	645.812^{+2.684}_{−2.665}		5590	
TOI-2107 b	0.83±0.11	1.211±0.035	2.454	0.0315^{+0.0006}_{−0.00067}	1397±20	transit + radial vel.	767.4^{+6.2}_{−5.9}	0.961^{+0.049}_{−0.054}	5627^{+94}_{−93}	
TOI-2120 b	<0.02139	0.1893±0.0056	5.8	0.0377±0.0013	351±6–384±6	transit	104.9	0.211±0.005	3131±30	
TOI-2128 b	0.014±0.006	0.186^{+0.008}_{−0.007}	16.341	0.127±0.003	780.5^{+14.8}_{−14.4}	transit	119.2±0.1	1.1^{+0.15}_{−0.12}	5991^{+114}_{−90}	
TOI-2264 b		0.3726±0.0355	55.08		373.1	transit	617.2^{+7.1}_{−6.9}	1.164^{+0.146}_{−0.168}	6140^{+129}_{−128}	
TOI-2266 b		0.1374±0.008	2.326	0.02±0.002	550±47	transit	168.6±0.2	0.23±0.02	3240±160	
TOI-2274 b			2.679		771	transit	159.9±0.2	0.612±0.02	3943±157	
TOI-2286 b		0.3343±0.0606	179.4		434.7	transit	761.6^{+3.4}_{−3.3}	1.487^{+0.322}_{−0.209}	6863^{+147}_{−277}	
TOI-2295 b	0.875^{+0.042}_{−0.041}	1.47^{+0.85}_{−0.53}	30.03	0.1992^{+0.0039}_{−0.0041}	747±24	transit	409.36^{+0.52}_{−0.46}	1.168^{+0.070}_{−0.071}	5730±140	Radius in unconstrained due to the planet's grazing transit.
TOI-2295 c	5.61^{+0.23}_{−0.24}		966.5^{+4.3}_{−4.2}	2.018^{+0.040}_{−0.042}	234.9±7.6	radial vel.	409.36^{+0.52}_{−0.46}	1.168^{+0.070}_{−0.071}	5730±140	
TOI-2328 b	0.16±0.02	0.89±0.04	17.102	0.127^{+0.005}_{−0.006}	842^{+20}_{−21}	transit	746.6±4.9	0.95±0.06	5525^{+147}_{−144}	
TOI-2368 b	0.65±0.18	0.967^{+0.036}_{−0.031}	5.175	0.05649±0.001	1000^{+44}_{−30}	transit	685±3.9	0.897^{+0.048}_{−0.049}	5360^{+230}_{−170}	
TOI-2373 b	9.3±0.2	0.93±0.02	13.337	0.112±0.001	860±10	transit	1617±33	1.041^{+0.032}_{−0.028}	5651±180	
TOI-2374 b	0.1782^{+0.011}_{−0.0134}	0.6075±0.0268	4.314	0.0471	<885±22	transit	439±3	0.75±0.01	4802±97	
TOI-2379 b	5.76±0.20	1.046±0.023	5.4693827±0.0000023	0.05263±0.00091	624±12	transit	689.5±3.6	0.645±0.033	3707±58	
TOI-2384 b	1.966±0.059	1.025±0.021	2.13570304±0.00000038	0.02793±0.00023	889.7±5.0	transit	609.9±4.9	0.635±0.016	3943±14	
TOI-2416 b	3^{+0.1}_{−0.09}	0.88±0.02	8.275	0.0831±0.0007	1080±10	transit	1767±261	1.118^{+0.029}_{−0.027}	5808±80	
TOI-2420 b	0.927^{+0.085}_{−0.079}	1.340^{+0.074}_{−0.072}	5.8426	0.0684^{+0.0067}_{−0.0059}	1571.6^{+60.8}_{−64}	transit	1450	1.158±0.098		
TOI-2458 b	0.04188^{+0.00311}_{−0.00302}	0.252^{+0.018}_{−0.016}	3.73659^{+0.00044}_{−0.00047}	0.0482^{+0.0025}_{−0.0027}	1509^{+41}_{−35}	transit	368.42^{+1.76}_{−1.74}	1.05±0.03	6005±50	Also known as HD 34562 b.
TOI-2458 c	0.03216^{+0.00538}_{−0.00598}		16.553^{+0.059}_{−0.061}	0.129±0.002		radial vel.	368.42^{+1.76}_{−1.74}	1.05±0.03	6005±50	
TOI-2477 b		1.156±0.403	34.78			transit	1181.4^{+16.8}_{−16.3}	1.73^{+0.40}_{−0.21}	7505^{+192}_{−222}	
TOI-2485 b	2.412^{+0.088}_{−0.087}	1.083±0.045	11.235	0.1093^{+0.0055}_{−0.0057}	1134^{+27}_{−25}	transit	1296	1.163±0.053		
TOI-2524 b	0.64±0.04	1^{+0.02}_{−0.03}	7.186	0.073±0.0007	1100±20	transit	1399±36	1.007^{+0.032}_{−0.029}	5831±80	
TOI-2529 b	2.34±0.2	1.03±0.05	64.5949±0.0003	0.327±0.02	636±15.7	transit	965.8^{+14}_{−13.7}	1.11^{+0.02}_{−0.02}	5802^{+60}_{−52}	
TOI-2537 b	1.307^{+0.091}_{−0.088}	1.004^{+0.059}_{−0.061}	94.1022±0.0011	0.3715^{+0.0077}_{−0.0080}	338±14	transit	594.97^{+3.42}_{−3.03}	0.771±0.049	4870±150	
TOI-2537 c	7.23^{+0.52}_{−0.45}		1920^{+230}_{−140}	2.78^{+0.22}_{−0.15}	123.1^{+6.3}_{−6.7}	radial vel.	594.97^{+3.42}_{−3.03}	0.771±0.049	4870±150	
TOI-2580 b	0.63±0.08	1.55±0.05	3.397750±0.000002	0.048±0.003	2410±60	transit	1236±16	1.33±0.08	6120±30	
TOI-2714 b	0.717^{+0.104}_{−0.101}	1.224^{+0.0625}_{−0.0598}	2.499	0.036±0.002	1603±65	transit	1930±16	1.07±0.06	5665±115	
TOI-2768 b		0.2688±0.0313	1.508		855	transit	255.8±0.6	0.63^{+0.06}_{−0.10}	4008^{+124}_{−137}	
TOI-2981 b	2.007±0.104	1.1955±0.0375	3.602	0.048±0.002	1358±39	transit	1741±16	1.03±0.06	5940±75	
TOI-3071 b	0.2146±0.011	0.6388^{+0.0509}_{−0.0455}	1.267	0.0249	<2155±40	transit	1582±29	1.29±0.02	6177±62	
TOI-3261 b	0.0953±0.0076	0.3408^{+0.0375}_{−0.0312}	0.883	0.01714	1722^{+26}_{−18}	transit	972.3^{+2.3}_{−3.1}	0.861^{+0.02}_{−0.03}	4995±47	Ultra-hot Neptune
TOI-3321 b	0.554±0.076	1.388^{+0.070}_{−0.064}	3.652	0.047±0.001	1616±30	transit	928^{+10.8}_{−10.4}	1.041^{+0.084}_{−0.068}	5850±140	
TOI-3353 b		0.238	4.67	0.060	1264	transit	257.1±0.2	1.33	6365	
TOI-3568 b	0.083±0.003	0.473±0.024	4.42	0.0485±0.0004	899±12	transit	645±2	0.78±0.02	4969±45	
TOI-3837 b	0.59±0.06	0.96±0.05	11.889	0.098±0.005	1182^{+30}_{−31}	transit	1000.3±18.9	0.89±0.05	5905^{+157}_{−155}	
TOI-3894 b	0.85±0.15	1.358^{+0.054}_{−0.052}	4.335	0.0543±0.0014	1519±22	transit	1343^{+12.7}_{−12.4}	1.138^{+0.089}_{−0.075}	6000±110	
TOI-3919 b	3.88±0.023	1.1±0.05	7.433	0.0795±0.0016	1200±15	transit	1973^{+28.7}_{−28.4}	1.208^{+0.067}_{−0.07}	6100±110	
TOI-4153 b	1.15±0.38	1.438±0.045	4.617	0.06311^{+0.00084}_{−0.00096}	1670^{+30}_{−40}	transit	1366±11.4	1.572^{+0.064}_{−0.071}	6860^{+150}_{−180}	
TOI-4336 Ab	0.017^{+0.013}_{−0.007}	0.1891	16.337	0.0872^{+0.0013}_{−0.0014}	308±9	transit	73.15	0.331±0.015	3298^{+75}_{−73}	Located in a triple hierarchical stellar system.
TOI-4356 b		0.321±0.198	289.92			transit	668.6±3.8	1.48^{+0.32}_{−0.19}	6855^{+140}_{−127}	
TOI-4364 b		0.1793^{+0.0089}_{−0.0082}	5.424	0.04753^{+0.00053}_{−0.00054}	488±4	transit	142.9±0.1	0.487^{+0.017}_{−0.016}	3528^{+33}_{−20}	Located in the Hyades.
TOI-4379 b	1.113±0.071	1.489±0.079	3.254			transit	2013^{+38}_{−39}	1.372^{+0.037}_{−0.105}	6020±100	
TOI-4438 b	0.017±0.0035	0.2248±0.0116	7.44	0.0534±0.009	400±50	transit	98	0.368±0.021	3422±81	
TOI-4443 b		0.153	1.85	0.030	1639	transit	183.0	1.05	5834	
TOI-4468 b		1.0197±0.0517	2.77			transit	1224.7±8.2	0.82	4975±122	
TOI-4468 c		0.296±0.023	7.01			transit	1224.7±8.2	0.82	4975±122	
TOI-4495 c		0.324	5.18	0.062	1383	transit	431.2	1.17	6156	
TOI-4504 b	0.03272±0.00283	0.240±0.017	2.426	0.03392±0.00068		transit	1117.43±5.57	0.89^{+0.06}_{−0.04}	5315±60	
TOI-4504 c	3.77±0.18	0.9897±0.0092	82.97213±0.00013	0.3546^{+0.0073}_{−0.0077}		transit + radial vel.	1117.43±5.57	0.89^{+0.06}_{−0.04}	5315±60	
TOI-4504 d	1.417±0.065		40.5634^{+0.0365}_{−0.0368}	0.2219^{+0.0041}_{−0.0043}		timing	1117.43±5.57	0.89^{+0.06}_{−0.04}	5315±60	
TOI-4527 b		0.0812	0.40	0.008	1363	transit	59.03	0.48	3702	
TOI-4562 c	5.77^{+0.37}_{−0.56}		3990^{+201}_{−192}	5.219±0.002		timing	1131±12	1.218^{+0.054}_{−0.048}	6096±32	
TOI-4602 b		0.227	3.98	0.051	1380	transit		1.12	6012	
TOI-4633 c	0.15^{+0.087}_{−0.075}	0.285^{+0.018}_{−0.017}	271.94	0.847±0.061	290	transit	310.4±0.78	1.05±0.06 or 1.1±0.06 (Note: It is not known which of the stars the planet orbits.)	5600±50 or 5800±50	Habitable-zone planet located in a binary star system. The temperature reaches 420 K when the stars are at periastron.
TOI-4914 b	0.714±0.041	1.1482±0.0321	10.6	0.098±0.003	894±20	transit	951±5	1.03±0.06	5805±62	
TOI-4994 b	0.280^{+0.037}_{−0.034}	0.762^{+0.030}_{−0.027}	21.491984±0.000023	0.1515^{+0.0032}_{−0.0031}	717.6^{+9.7}_{−10}	transit	1079±8	1.005^{+0.064}_{−0.061}	5640±110	
TOI-5005 b	0.103±0.018	0.558±0.021	6.309	0.06614±0.0045	1040±20	transit	685±2	0.97±0.02	5749±61	
TOI-5027 b	2.01±0.13	0.99^{+0.07}_{−0.12}	10.244	0.093±0.004	1056^{+23}_{−24}	transit	659.5±4.9	1.02±0.05	5909^{+145}_{−144}	
TOI-5076 b	0.0503±0.00629	0.285±0.00892	23.445±0.001		615±20	transit	270.057±0.326	0.80±0.07	5070±143	
TOI-5082 b		0.227	4.24	0.051	1165	transit		1.00	5670	
TOI-5110 b	2.90±0.13	1.069^{+0.054}_{−0.052}	30.159	0.2157^{+0.0042}_{−0.0044}	976^{+33}_{−32}	transit	1170.64^{+5.12}_{−9.65}	1.469^{+0.089}_{−0.088}	6160±150	
TOI-5218 b	0.799^{+0.393}_{−0.359}	0.879±0.034	4.291	0.0469±0.0006	783±21	transit	1243±11	0.739±0.03	4230±88	
TOI-5232 b	2.34±0.16	1.14^{+0.05}_{−0.045}	4.097	0.0599±0.001	1772^{+40}_{−45}	transit	1985^{+28}_{−27}	1.389^{+0.068}_{−0.075}	6500^{+180}_{−190}	
TOI-5301 b	3.65±0.4	1.18^{+0.08}_{−0.07}	5.859	0.0726^{+0.0013}_{−0.0024}	1655±40	transit	1914^{+59}_{−55}	1.483^{+0.081}_{−0.14}	6240±160	
TOI-5319 b		0.33427±0.0551	4.079		695	transit	199.4±0.7	0.5±0.1	3580^{+107}_{−141}	
TOI-5388 b		0.169	2.59	0.024	601	transit	60.40	0.29	3495	
TOI-5575 b		0.8459±0.0255	32.07		195	transit	184.9±0.6	0.21±0.02	3176±157	
TOI-5616 b	0.802^{+0.371}_{−0.384}	0.961^{+0.048}_{−0.042}	2.003	0.0272±0.0003	939±27	transit	1249±14	0.666±0.025	3996±88	
TOI-5634 Ab	0.576^{+0.406}_{−0.346}	0.923^{+0.056}_{−0.050}	2.2035	0.0272±0.0003	837±34	transit	1051^{+20}_{−18}	0.556±0.022	3896±88	
TOI-5688 Ab	0.390^{+0.074}_{−0.077}	0.920^{+0.053}_{−0.062}	2.948	0.03379^{+0.00046}_{−0.00045}	742±18	transit	735.8^{+4.2}_{−4.9}	0.60±0.02	3713±59	
TOI-5713 b	0.0135^{+0.0053}_{−0.0035}	0.1579^{+0.0152}_{−0.0125}	10.44	0.06008±0.00046	347±3	transit	133.7	0.265±0.006	3228±41	
TOI-5720 b	0.0041^{+0.0029}_{−0.0015}	0.0972±0.0062	1.434	0.0183±0.0003	708±19	transit	116.9±0.1	0.383±0.019	3325±75	
TOI-5723 b		1.146±0.068	56.88			transit	1878^{+22}_{−21}	1.01^{+0.12}_{−0.15}	5695^{+110}_{−170}	
TOI-5731 b		0.401±0.046	90.1			transit	358.2±0.8	0.697^{+0.088}_{−0.077}	4448^{+92}_{−123}	
TOI-5975 b		0.7536±0.0422	186.52			transit	1141^{+7.1}_{−7.0}	1.335^{+0.260}_{−0.188}	6508^{+83}_{−163}	
TOI-6002 b	0.0119^{+0.005}_{−0.0031}	0.1454^{+0.0107}_{−0.017}	10.905	0.05722±0.00044	321^{+7}_{−5}	transit	104.6	0.21	3241^{+80}_{−60}	
TOI-6008 b	0.00346^{+0.0023}_{−0.0011}	0.0919±0.0045	0.858	0.0108±0.0002	707±19	transit	75.05±0.03	0.23±0.011	3075±75	Ultra-short period planet
TOI-6016 b	1.17±0.09	1.22±0.03	4.023687±0.000003	0.055±0.002	1890±40	transit	1190±13	1.31±0.08	6110±50	
TOI-6029 b	1.635±0.032	1.284±0.098	5.7987±0.0004			transit	1946^{+37}_{−36}	1.548^{+0.027}_{−0.085}	6223±100	
TOI-6034 b	0.798±0.075	1.063±0.042	2.576184(2)	0.02949^{+0.00043}_{−0.00044}	714±21	transit	385	0.514^{+0.025}_{−0.022}	3635±88	It was first discovered by NASA's Transiting Exoplanet Survey Satellite (TESS). It is a gas giant with a density of about 0.82 g/cm^{3} and a temperature of 714 ± 21 K (440.9 ± 21.0 °C). Its orbit takes about 2.058 days and has an inclination to the plane of the sky of 87.06°+0.22° −0.21° and an eccentricity of about 0.04.
TOI-6086 b	0.00346^{+0.00362}_{−0.00176}	0.1053±0.0062	1.389	0.0154±0.0002	634±16	transit	102.6	0.254±0.013	3200±75	
TOI-6130 b	1.05±0.06	1.28±0.03	2.392679±0.000002	0.036±0.002	1750±40	transit	721±10	1.16±0.07	5940±50	
TOI-6303 b	7.84±0.31	1.034^{+0.054}_{−0.057}	9.4852360±0.0000162	0.07610±0.00100	541±14	transit	495.17±1.37	0.644±0.024	3977±59	
TOI-6324 b	0.0041±0.0006	0.0937	0.28			transit	67.02±0.05	0.272±0.020	3358±160	
TOI-6330 b	10±0.32	0.972^{+0.033}_{−0.031}	6.8500246±0.0000033	0.05763^{+0.00073}_{−0.00077}	495±14	transit	468.07±1.79	0.531±0.021	3539±59	
TOI-6383 Ab	1.04±0.094	1.008^{+0.036}_{−0.033}	1.791	0.02292±0.00037	745±23	transit	561^{+3.0}_{−2.7}	0.458±0.011	3444±88	
TOI-6651 b	0.1919^{+0.0239}_{−0.0249}	0.4541^{+0.0241}_{−0.0232}	5.057	0.06330^{+0.00078}_{−0.00072}	1493^{+14}_{−15}	transit	690±3	1.323^{+0.050}_{−0.045}	5940±110	
TOI-6628 b	0.75±0.06	0.98±0.05	18.184	0.133±0.007	836^{+22}_{−23}	transit	1028±27	0.97±0.06	5463^{+143}_{−142}	
TOI-7041 b	0.36±0.16	1.02±0.03	9.691±0.006			transit	1431±10	1.12±0.02	4640±10	
VHS J183135.58-551355.9	6.5±1.5	1.42^{+0.04}_{−0.03}			1085±60	imaging	180.6±17.9			Free-floating planet
WASP-132d	5.16±0.52		1816.6±44.4	2.71±0.12	107^{+11}_{−18}	radial vel.	401.53±1.86	0.789±0.039	4686±99	
Wolf 327 b	0.00796±0.00145	0.1106±0.0054	0.573	0.01	996±22	transit	92.9	0.405±0.019	3542±70	Ultra-short period planet

== Specific exoplanet lists ==
Lists of exoplanets

- List of directly imaged exoplanets
- List of exoplanet extremes
- List of exoplanet firsts
- List of exoplanets discovered by the Kepler space telescope
- List of exoplanets observed during Kepler's K2 mission
- List of exoplanets discovered by the TESS mission
- List of terrestrial exoplanet candidates for atmosphere detection
- List of hottest exoplanets
- List of coldest exoplanets
- List of multiplanetary systems
- List of circumbinary planets
- List of nearest exoplanets
- List of nearest terrestrial exoplanet candidates
- List of potentially habitable exoplanets
- List of proper names of exoplanets
- List of largest exoplanets
- List of smallest exoplanets
- List of transiting exoplanets
- List of exoplanets and planetary debris around giant stars
- List of exoplanets and planetary debris around white dwarfs
- List of extrasolar planetary collisions

=== Lists of exoplanets by year of discovery ===
- List of exoplanets discovered before 2000 (31)
- List of exoplanets discovered between 2000–2009 (376)
- List of exoplanets discovered in 2010 (109)
- List of exoplanets discovered in 2011 (178)
- List of exoplanets discovered in 2012 (147)
- List of exoplanets discovered in 2013 (149)
- List of exoplanets discovered in 2014 (869)
- List of exoplanets discovered in 2015 (144)
- List of exoplanets discovered in 2016 (1497)
- List of exoplanets discovered in 2017 (152)
- List of exoplanets discovered in 2018 (300)
- List of exoplanets discovered in 2019 (169)
- List of exoplanets discovered in 2020 (256)
- List of exoplanets discovered in 2021 (253)
- List of exoplanets discovered in 2022 (312)
- List of exoplanets discovered in 2023 (304)
- List of exoplanets discovered in 2024 (284)
- List of exoplanets discovered in 2025 (239)
- List of exoplanets discovered in 2026 (352)
