= HD 73344 =

Star in the constellation Cancer

Observation data Epoch J2000 Equinox J2000
- Constellation: Cancer
- Right ascension: 08^{h} 38^{m} 45.52054^{s}
- Declination: +23° 41′ 09.2561″
- Apparent magnitude (V): 6.876±0.032

Characteristics
- Evolutionary stage: Main sequence
- Spectral type: F6V
- B−V color index: 0.547

Astrometry
Radial velocity (R_{v})	6.28±0.13 km/s
Proper motion (μ)	RA: −47.495 mas/yr Dec.: −148.502 mas/yr
Parallax (π)	28.3757±0.0213 mas
Distance	114.94 ± 0.09 ly (35.24 ± 0.03 pc)
Absolute magnitude (M_{V})	4.20

Details
Mass	1.20±0.02 M_{☉}
Radius	1.22±0.04 R_{☉}
Luminosity	1.79 L_{☉}
Temperature	6220±64 K
Metallicity [Fe/H]	0.18±0.043 dex
Rotation	9.09±0.04 d
Age	1.15+0.30 −0.33 Gyr

Other designations
- BD+24 1968, HD 73344, HIP 42403, SAO 80310, LSPM J0838+2341, TIC 175193677, GSC 01942-01827, 2MASS J08384552+2341094

Database references
SIMBAD	data
Exoplanet Archive	data

HD 73344 is a star located in the constellation Cancer. It has a faint apparent magnitude of 6.9 and therefore can't be seen by the naked eye. It is located 35.2 parsecs (115 light-years) away based on parallax measurements. This star hosts three confirmed exoplanets.

== Characteristics ==
HD 73344 is a F-type main-sequence star, a star hotter and brighter than the Sun that fuses atoms of hydrogen into helium at its core. It is 22% larger, 20% more massive and 80% more luminous, and its effective temperature is 448 degrees hotter, at 6,220 K (5,950 °C). On the other hand, it is younger than the Sun, estimated to be between one and two billion years old, or one-fifth to two-fifths of the solar age. As a consequence, HD 73344 rotates quickly, taking nine days to rotate at its equator (the Sun's rotational period is of 25 days), and is much more active than the Sun.

Located at 35 parsecs (110 light-years) from Earth, HD 73344 has an apparent magnitude, that is, its brightness as seen from Earth, of 6.876. Therefore, it is too faint to be seen to the naked eye, and needs a small telescope or binoculars to be seen. Distance and apparent brightness allow the absolute magnitude—the star's brightness if seen at 10 parsecs (33 light-years)—to be calculated at 4.2. This star has a nearly circular orbit around the Milky Way, a maximum distance of 40 pc (130 ly) from the galactic plane and a distance from the Galactic Center varying from 6,880 to 8,840 parsecs (22,400 to 28,800 light-years) across its orbit.

== Planetary system ==
There are three exoplanets orbiting HD 73344, all discovered in 2024 via multiple methods of detection: transit, radial velocity and astrometry.

The planets' orbital periods range from two weeks to a 16 years. They are all misaligned with each other: Planet b and c have a misalignment of at least 20 degrees, and planet d is misaligned with the inner planets' orbits, in contrast to the Solar System, where the planetary orbits are well aligned. There are two hypotheses that could explain the misalignment: A warped protoplanetary disk with misaligned inner and outer components, or dynamical encounters with two or more giant planets in the past.

The HD 73344 planetary system
Companion (in order from star)	Mass	Semimajor axis (AU)	Orbital period	Eccentricity	Inclination	Radius
b	2.98+2.50 −1.90 M_{🜨} (<10.48 M_{🜨})	0.131+0.0003 −0.0002	15.611 d	0.030+0.019 −0.013	88.082°+0.051° −0.056°	2.884+0.082 −0.072 R_{🜨}
c	≥0.367+0.022 −0.021 M_{J}	0.343+0.0009 −0.0006	65.94±0.02 d	0.124+0.052 −0.053	–	–
d	2.55+0.56 −0.46 M_{J}	6.70+0.25 −0.26	15.95+0.85 −0.84 yr	0.2±0.1	58°+19° −16°	–

=== HD 73344 b ===
HD 73344 b was the first exoplanet discovered in the system, detected via the transit method. Initially detected as a candidate by K2 in 2018, it was confirmed by S. Sulis and others in 2024 using TESS data. It is classified as a sub-Neptune. This planet has around three times the size of Earth as determined by transit observations. Its mass is uncertain, estimated at 3.0+2.5
−1.9 times Earth's mass and believed to be no more than ten Earth masses. This implies a low density of 0.68+0.59
−0.44 g/cm^{3}, suggesting that its atmosphere is composed of volatile elements like hydrogen and helium. However, further observations are needed, including a more precise mass, to fully characterize its composition and reveal its true nature.

It is the closest exoplanet to HD 73344, completing an orbit every 16 days at an average distance of 0.131 astronomical units (19,600,000 km), less than half of the Mercury-Sun distance (0.31 AU). The proximity of its host star also means it has a high temperature. Assuming a null albedo, the equilibrium temperature of HD 73344 b is estimated at 910 K (637 °C; 1,178 °F), or 1,066 K (793 °C; 1,459 °F) if it is tidally locked. It has a low orbital eccentricity and appears to be misaligned with its star's spin axis.

=== HD 73344 c ===
HD 73344 c is a sub-Saturn planet, first identified by Sulis et al. 2024 (the same discoverers of planet b) via radial velocity observations and confirmed by Jingwen et al. some months later. Its mass, derived via radial velocity observations, is at least 110 Earth masses, equivalent to 0.37 Jupiter masses (M_{J}), and no more than 0.7 M_{J}, as a mass greater than this would induce an unstable planetary system. Since HD 73344 c does not transit its host star, its radius cannot be measured.

This planet, like HD 73344 b, lies at a close distance to its host star, with an orbital period of 66 days and an average distance of 0.34 astronomical units, similar to Mercury. The orbital eccentricity is small, at 0.12±0.05, and the inclination is not precisely known, but is no less than 30° and is at least 20° different from planet b's inclination. The equilibrium temperature is estimated to be 562 K (289 °C; 552 °F) assuming a null albedo.

HD 73344 b and c are strongly coupled with each other and undergo nodal precession, meaning that their orbital inclinations vary over time, becoming sometimes misaligned with the host star's spin axis.

=== HD 73344 d ===
HD 73344 d is a Jovian planet, first identified in 27-year baseline radial velocity observations from multiple observatories, and later in Hipparcos-Gaia astrometric observations. Its mass, measured via astrometry, is two and a half times the mass of Jupiter.

This planet has a wide orbit around HD 73344, and if placed in our Solar System, would lie between that of Jupiter and Saturn, at 6.7 astronomical units. It takes 16 years to complete an orbit around HD 73344. HD 73344 d is therefore classified as a Jupiter analog due to their physical and orbital characteristics being similar.

== See also ==
- List of exoplanets discovered in 2024
- Kepler-56, HAT-P-11 and Pi Mensae, other systems similar orbital architectures and misaligned orbits
