= TOI-6883 =

Double star

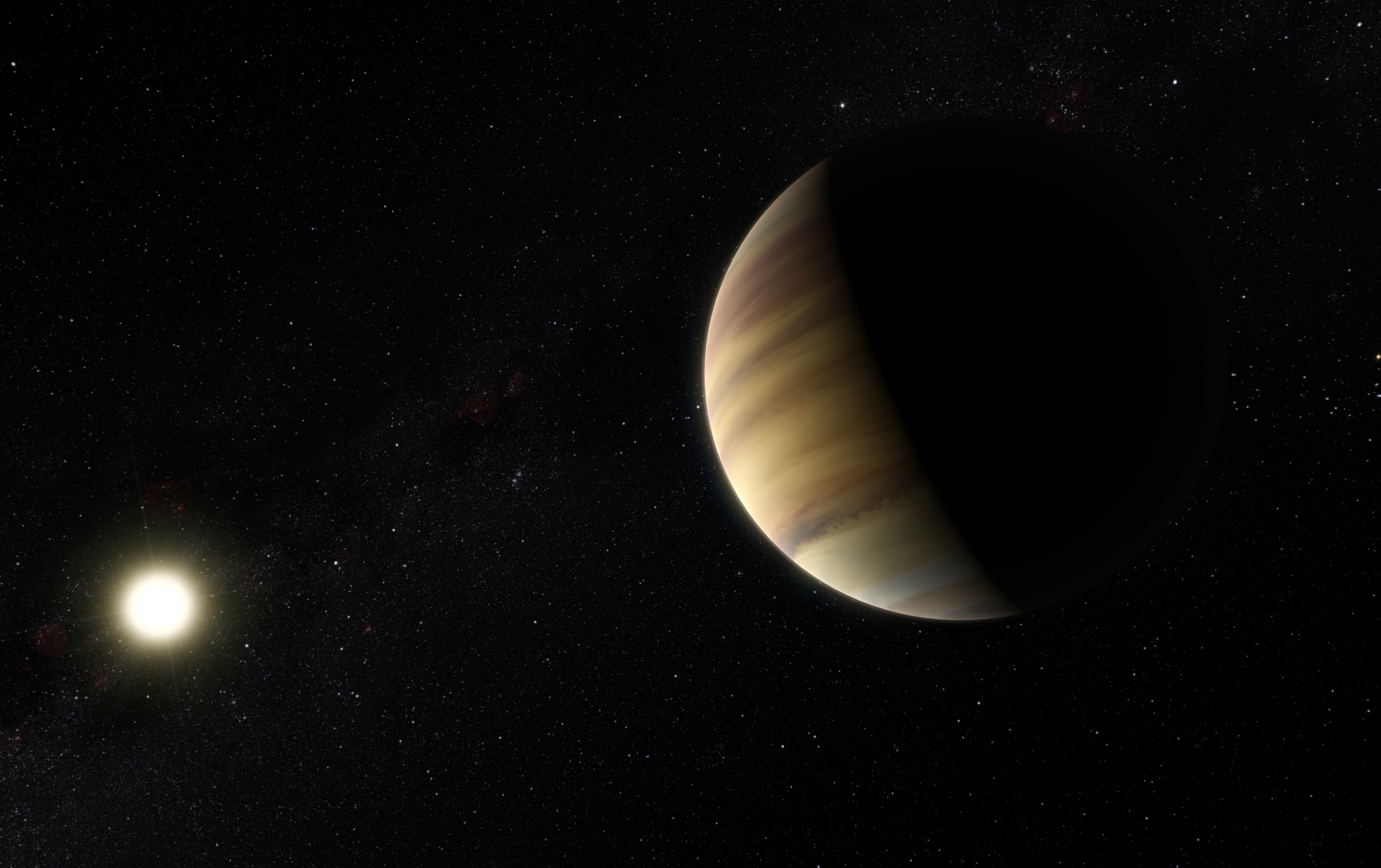
- Artist's impressions of TOI-6883 system

Observation data Epoch J2000.0 Equinox ICRS
- Constellation: Delphinus
- A
- Right ascension: 20^{h} 41^{m} 10.067^{s}
- Declination: +03° 38′ 19.25″
- Apparent magnitude (V): 9.48
- B
- Right ascension: 20^{h} 41^{m} 10.300^{s}
- Declination: +03° 38′ 24.88″
- Apparent magnitude (V): 11.20

Characteristics

A
- Evolutionary stage: Main sequence
- Spectral type: G

B
- Evolutionary stage: Main sequence
- Spectral type: G

Astrometry

A
Proper motion (μ)	RA: −56.677 mas/yr Dec.: −89.096 mas/yr
Parallax (π)	10.6121±0.0154 mas
Distance	307.3 ± 0.4 ly (94.2 ± 0.1 pc)

B
Proper motion (μ)	RA: −53.136 mas/yr Dec.: −101.579 mas/yr
Parallax (π)	11.8192±0.1557 mas
Distance	276 ± 4 ly (85 ± 1 pc)

Details

A
Mass	1.082+0.055 −0.056 M_{☉}
Radius	1.086±0.020 R_{☉}
Luminosity	1.168+0.065 −0.063 L_{☉}
Surface gravity (log g)	4.402+0.013 −0.018 cgs
Temperature	5756+67 −66 K
Metallicity [Fe/H]	0.318±0.058 dex
Age	3.8+2.6 −2.1 Gyr

B
Mass	0.702 M_{☉}
Radius	0.701 R_{☉}
Luminosity	0.246 L_{☉}
Surface gravity (log g)	4.60 cgs
Temperature	4,892 K

Other designations
- BD+03 4397, TOI-6883
- A: TIC 393818343
- B: TIC 393818340

Database references
SIMBAD	A
- B
Exoplanet Archive	data

TOI-6883 is a wide double or binary star located in the constellation of Delphinus. It is composed of two Sun-like stars, TOI-6883A and TOI-6883B. The primary star is at a distance of approximately 94 parsecs (307 light-years) from Earth.

== Characteristics ==
Both stars are classified as G-type main-sequence stars with masses and radii similar to that of the Sun. They are separated by approximately 6.5 arcseconds, corresponding to a projected separation of ~616 astronomical units (AU), assuming both stars are at the same distance.

Gaia DR3, as accessed through VizieR or the Gaia Archive, shows significantly different parallaxes for the two stars, suggesting they are at different distances (about 30 light-years apart) and the system is an optical double.

However, a 2025 paper by Conzo et al. published in Research Notes of the AAS (which is not peer-reviewed) claims a different parallax for star B, attributed to Gaia DR3, that is similar to that of star A (~10.6 mas). The paper argues that this, along with consistent proper motions, supports the idea that the two stars form a gravitationally-bound and dynamically stable binary system, with an orbital period of ~15,300 years.

== Planetary system ==
The TOI-6883 system has at least one planet: TOI-6883Ab is a hot Jupiter-type exoplanet orbiting the primary star TOI-6883A with a period of about 16.25 days. The planet was first detected via transit by the Transiting Exoplanet Survey Satellite (TESS) and later confirmed by ground-based photometric observations. Based on their claim of the binary nature of the host star, Conzo et al. updated the planet's designation from TOI-6883b to TOI-6883Ab in accordance with IAU naming conventions for multiple stellar systems.

With a radius of ~1.1 Jupiter radii, the planet produces a transit depth of about 1.3%. The presence of the secondary star TOI-6883B may influence the planet’s long-term orbital evolution via dynamical mechanisms such as Kozai–Lidov oscillations.

The TOI-6883A planetary system
Companion (in order from star)	Mass	Semimajor axis (AU)	Orbital period (days)	Eccentricity	Inclination (°)	Radius
b	4.34±0.15 M_{J}	0.1291+0.0021 −0.0022	16.24921+0.00010 −0.00011	0.6058±0.0023	89.57+0.30 −0.38	1.087+0.023 −0.021 R_{J}
