= 2MASS J05581644−4501559 =

Young and relatively nearby red dwarf

2MASS J0558
- 2MASS J0558 and its companion (white cross-hair at the bottom); Credit: Legacy Surveys / D.Lang (Perimeter Institute) & Meli thev

Observation data Epoch J2000 Equinox J2000
- Constellation: Pictor
- Right ascension: 05^{h} 58^{m} 16.44^{s}
- Declination: −45° 01′ 56.0″
- Apparent magnitude (V): 14.928 ±0.01

Characteristics
- Evolutionary stage: red dwarf
- Spectral type: M4V
- Variable type: flare star

Astrometry
Radial velocity (R_{v})	11.04±3.62 km/s
Proper motion (μ)	RA: −66.975±0.014 mas/yr Dec.: +61.824±0.016 mas/yr
Parallax (π)	37.0938±0.0119 mas
Distance	87.93 ± 0.03 ly (26.959 ± 0.009 pc)

Details
Mass	0.230±0.007 M_{☉}
Radius	0.260±0.008 R_{☉}
Luminosity	(5.95±0.17)×10^{−03} L_{☉}
Temperature	3,232±107 K
Age	120-650 Myr

Other designations
- UCAC4 225−007620, RX J0558.3−4501, 1RXS J055818.1−450146, TIC 180972066, WISE J055816.36−450155.4, Gaia DR2 4801596282413400192

Database references
SIMBAD	data
- companion

2MASS J0558 (also known as 2MASS J05581644−4501559) is a young red dwarf. It has one planetary-mass object orbiting it at a separation of 1043 astronomical units.

== The host star ==
The primary was observed at the Southern African Large Telescope (SALT) and the spectrum agrees with an M4V spectral type. The star shows several features of youth, such as H-alpha emission and likely shallower absorption due to TiO, CaH and FeH. TESS shows a variability with a period of 1.56 days and several flares. A short rotation period and the frequency of flares also agree with a young age. The researchers use the rotation period to determine an age limit of 120-650 Million years (Myr). The higher brightness in ultraviolet and maybe x-ray from GALEX and ROSAT are also in agreement with this age. The researchers find that the star could be a member of the 30-100 Myr old Octans-Near moving group, but the nature of this moving group is disputed.

== Planetary system ==
CWISEP J055816.68−450233.6 was first identified as a possible proper motion object by the CatWISE team in 2020 in WISE data and with Spitzer follow-up. But this team was not able to confirm the motion of this object. Follow-up observations with Magellan/FIRE showed a near-infrared spectral type of T8.5 and it was mentioned for the first time that it could be a companion to 2MASS J0558 (see table 2). In 2024 it was discovered that this T-dwarf co-moves with 2MASS J0558 from WISE/NEOWISE data and it was given the name 0558B. The pair is separated by 38.67 arcseconds. The paper also mentions which citizen scientist from the backyard worlds project discovered this object. The discoverers are the CatWISE team, Arttu Sainio, Dan Caselden and Jim Walla. The spectrum does not show strong peculiarities and the companion was classified as a T8. It does show enhanced K-band spectrum, but it is not clear if this is a sign of youth. From the age of the primary, the secondary has a mass of 6-12 M_{J}, meaning it is below the deuterium-burning limit. This makes this object a planetary-mass companion.

== See also ==
- List of directly imaged exoplanets
- List of exoplanets discovered in 2024
