= Gaia-4 b =

First exoplanet confirmed by Gaia

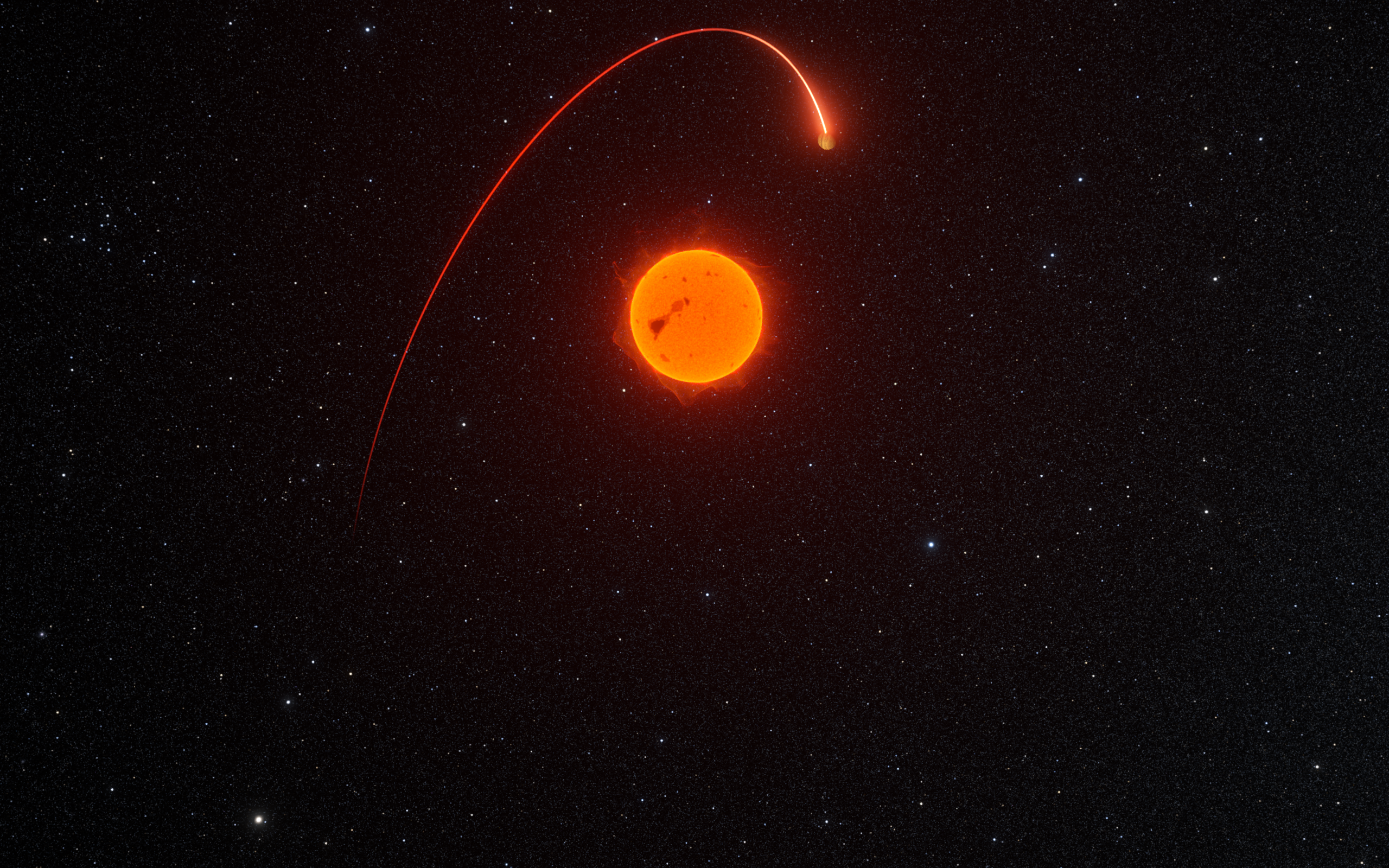
- Artistic representation of Gaia-4 b around its host star

Discovery
- Discovered by: Stefánsson et al. 2025
- Discovery site: Gaia
- Discovery date: 2025
- Detection method: Astrometry; Radial Velocity

Orbital characteristics
- Inclination: 116.9 ± 4.4
- Star: Gaia-4

Physical characteristics
- Mass: 11.8 M_{J}

Gaia-4 b is a massive gas giant exoplanet, classified as a super-Jupiter, orbiting the low-mass K-type star Gaia-4. Located approximately 244 light-years from Earth, it was discovered using astrometric data from the European Space Agency's Gaia mission, marking it as one of the first exoplanets confirmed through this method. It has a mass of 11.8 M_{J}.

== Discovery ==
Gaia-4 b was identified through the Gaia mission's Data Release 3 (DR3), which detected the astrometric wobble of the host star caused by the planet's gravitational influence. Confirmation came via radial velocity measurements using ground-based spectrographs, including the Habitable-zone Planet Finder (HPF) on the Hobby-Eberly Telescope, the NEID spectrograph on the WIYN 3.5m Telescope, and the FIber-fed Echelle Spectrograph (FIES) on the Nordic Optical Telescope. These observations ruled out alternative explanations, such as a background star or binary companion, confirming Gaia-4 b as a planetary body.

== Host star ==
Gaia-4 is a K-type star located 244 ly from the Earth in the constellation Canes Venatici, with a right ascension of 13^{h} 58^{m} 1.62^{s} and a declination of +31° 41′ 43.5″.
