= TOI-6883Ab =

Exoplanet in the constellation Delphinus

Discovery
- Discovered by: Conzo G. & Moriconi M. and Sgro L. et al.
- Discovery site: Transiting Exoplanet Survey Satellite
- Discovery date: February 26, 2024
- Detection method: Transit

Designations
- Alternative names: TIC 393818343 b

Orbital characteristics
- Epoch J2000.0
- Semi-major axis: 0.1291 ± 0.0021 AU (19,310,000 ± 310,000 km)
- Eccentricity: 0.6058 ± 0.0023
- Orbital period (sidereal): 16.24921 ± 0.00010 d
- Inclination: 89.6 ± 0.30
- Time of perihelion: 2459810.145 ± 0.015
- Argument of perihelion: 1.69 ± 0.49
- Star: TOI-6883AB

Physical characteristics
- Mean radius: 1.087 ± 0.023 R_{J}
- Mass: 4.34 ± 0.15 M_{J}
- Temperature: 805.5 ± 9.6 K (532.35 ± 9.60 °C; 990.23 ± 17.28 °F)

TOI-6883Ab is a Jupiter-like extrasolar planet orbiting TOI-6883A, a Sun-like star in the constellation Delphinus 307 light years (94.17 pc) from Earth.

== Discovery ==
It was discovered in 2024 by Italian amateur astronomers Giuseppe Conzo and Mara Moriconi using the transit method with TESS data. At the beginning, a single transit event was identified, so the extrasolar planet was first classified as a candidate with TOI-6883.01 nomenclature. The discovery describes a planet with a radius of 1.087 times that of Jupiter, but without details of the orbital period.

The planet was confirmed by the professional astronomers of SETI team led by Lauren Sgro, who fully characterised it using the radial velocity method and the orbital period was identified. TOI-6883Ab revolves around its star in about 16.25 days at a distance of 0.123 AU (astronomical units) with a very eccentric orbit.

== See also ==
- HD 80606 b
- Upsilon Andromedae b
- Hot Jupiter
