= BX Trianguli =

Binary star in the constellation Triangulum

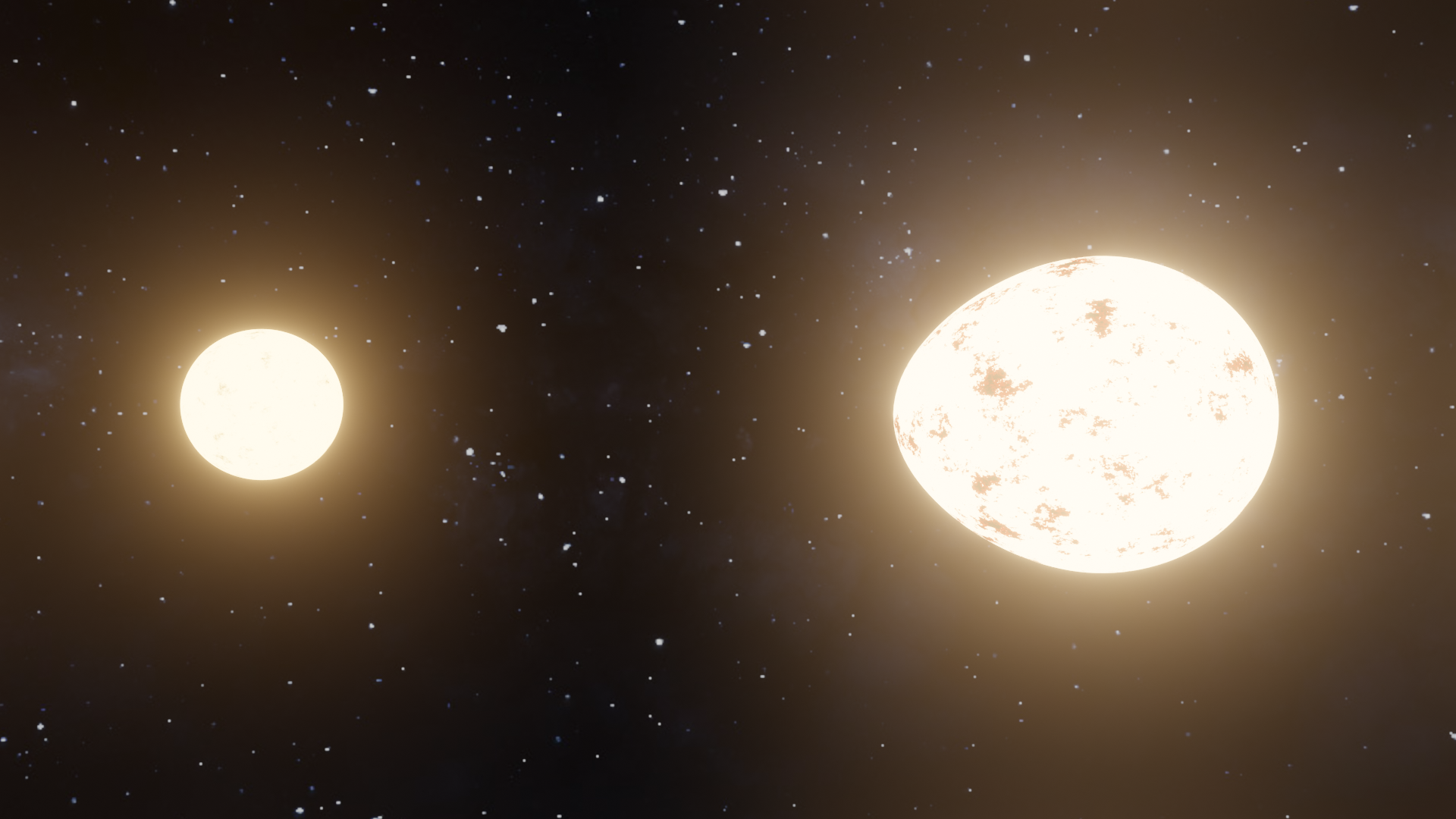
- Artist's impression of BX Trianguli. The planet is not represented here.

Observation data Epoch J2000 Equinox J2000
- Constellation: Triangulum
- Right ascension: 02^{h} 20^{m} 50.85419^{s}
- Declination: +33° 20′ 47.4683″
- Apparent magnitude (V): 13.366±0.006

Characteristics
- Evolutionary stage: Red dwarf
- Spectral type: M2
- Variable type: Eclipsing binary + Flare star

Astrometry
Proper motion (μ)	RA: +144.250 mas/yr Dec.: –111.210 mas/yr
Parallax (π)	18.9896±0.0259 mas
Distance	171.8 ± 0.2 ly (52.66 ± 0.07 pc)

Orbit
Primary	A
Name	B
Period (P)	0.1926 days (4.62 hours)
Semi-major axis (a)	1.33±0.03 R_{☉}
Inclination (i)	66.89±0.45°

Details

A
Mass	0.578±0.04 M_{☉}
Radius	0.59±0.01 R_{☉}
Luminosity	0.053 L_{☉}
Temperature	3,735 K

B
Mass	0.28±0.02 M_{☉}
Radius	0.27±0.01 R_{☉}
Luminosity	0.007 L_{☉}
Temperature	3,359±28 K

Other designations
- BX Tri, LSPM J0220+3320, GSC 02314-00530, 2MASS J02205082+3320479, NSVS 6550671

Database references
SIMBAD	data

BX Trianguli is a binary system made up of two red dwarfs, in the constellation Triangulum. Both stars eclipse each other and have an orbital period of four hours and 40 minutes. They are located at around 170 light-years (52.1 parsecs) from Earth based upon parallax measurements.

== Variability ==
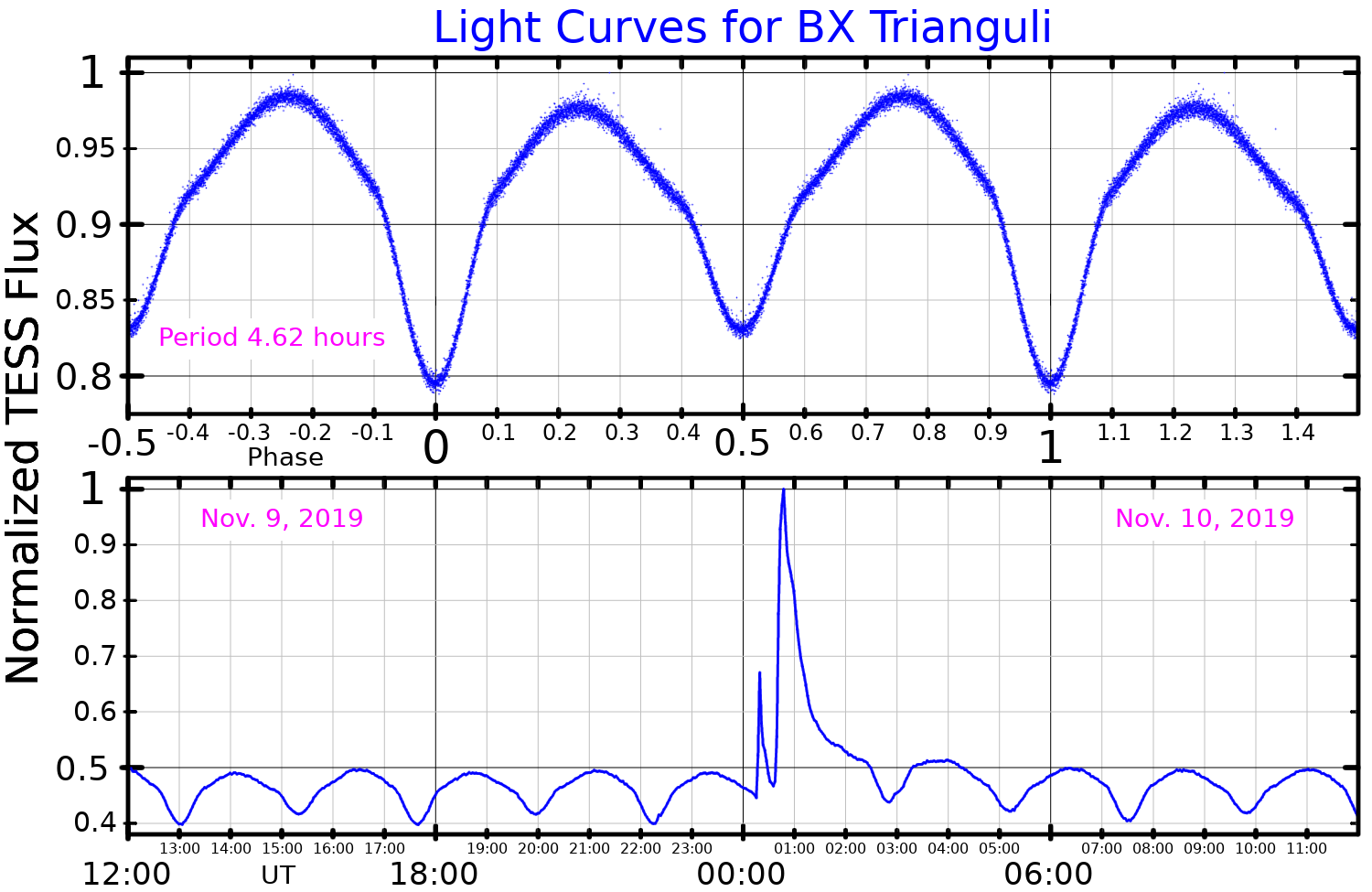
Light curves for BX Triangluli, plotted from TESS data. The upper plot shows the variability as a function of orbital phase, and the lower plot shows a flare.

This is an eclipsing binary variable, first identified by the Northern Sky Variability Survey survey in 2004 and given its variable-star designation BX Trianguli in 2010. Both stars in the system eclipse each other as seen from Earth, causing the brightness of the system to drop from a magnitude of 12.35 to 12.6/12.7 on the secondary/primary ecplise respectively.

The system has also been identified as a flare star. Six flares were recorded between 2014 and 2017, the strongest being identified in November 2014, four times stronger than a typical superflare. The large occurrence of flares on BX Trianguli is the highest among eclipsing binaries after Castor C (YY Geminorum) and might be related to rapid mass transfer between the components. These flares likely occur on BX Trianguli B.

BX Trianguli also has strong magnetic activity, manifested as starspots on the primary's surface and Hα emission.

== Characteristics ==
This system is composed of two red dwarfs, which have an ultra-short period of just 4.6 hours and a separation of 1.33 solar radii, or two and a half times the distance to the Moon. This orbit is one of the shortest known among main sequence stars. The primary star, named BX Trianguli A, has a mass equivalent to 58% the solar mass and a radius equivalent to 60% of the solar radius, while the secondary BX Trianguli B is smaller, at 28% and 27% of the solar mass and radius respectively. BX Trianguli has a semi-detached configuration, with the "A" component being distorted due to gravitational interactions with its partner.

There is a star that could be bound to this system, called USNO-B1 1233−0046425, at roughly 3500 astronomical units of distance.

== Planetary system ==
A circumbinary planet was discovered after analysis of eclipse timing variations by a high school student and his teacher. After ruling out alternative explanations for the eclipse timing variations, the two discoverers found that they are caused by a seven-Jupiter-mass planet at a separation of 4.5 astronomical units (670,000,000 km), with an orbital eccentricity of 0.4. The findings were published in 2024 at the American Association of Variable Star Observers's 113th Annual Meeting.

The BX Trianguli planetary system
Companion (in order from star)	Mass	Semimajor axis (AU)	Orbital period (days)	Eccentricity	Inclination (°)	Radius
b	7.5 M_{J}	4.5	—	0.4	—	—
