= HD 48948 =

Star in the constellation Lynx

Observation data Epoch J2000 Equinox ICRS
- Constellation: Lynx
- Right ascension: 06^{h} 49^{m} 57.0256^{s}
- Declination: +60° 20′ 07.9606″
- Apparent magnitude (V): 8.58

Characteristics
- Evolutionary stage: Main sequence star
- Spectral type: K3V
- Apparent magnitude (J): 6.33±0.02
- Apparent magnitude (H): 5.73±0.02
- Apparent magnitude (K): 5.61±0.02
- B−V color index: 1.21

Astrometry
Radial velocity (R_{v})	−52.58±0.12 km/s
Proper motion (μ)	RA: 253.401 mas/yr Dec.: 410.798 mas/yr
Parallax (π)	59.3934±0.0228 mas
Distance	54.91 ± 0.02 ly (16.837 ± 0.006 pc)
Absolute magnitude (M_{V})	7.46±0.05

Details
Mass	0.686+0.020 −0.013 M_{☉}
Radius	0.679±0.004 R_{☉}
Luminosity	0.156 L_{☉}
Temperature	4593±60 K
Metallicity [Fe/H]	−0.21±0.03 dex
Rotation	43.45+1 −0.71 d
Rotational velocity (v sin i)	<2 km/s
Age	11.48+1.93 −4.67 Gyr

Other designations
- BD+60°1003, GJ 247, HD 48948, HIP 32769, SAO 13971, G 250-22, L 1815-6, LHS 6111, TYC 4097-1471-1, 2MASS J06495699+6020077

Database references
SIMBAD	data
Exoplanet Archive	data
ARICNS	data

HD 48948 is a K-type main-sequence star located in the constellation Lynx, approximately 55 light years away, based on a parallax of 59.393 mas. At an apparent magnitude of 8.58, it is too faint to be seen with the naked eye.

It has a stellar classification of K3V, which classifies it as a main sequence star (like the Sun) fusing atoms of hydrogen into helium at its core. Estimated to be 11.5 billion years old, HD 48948 has 0.68 times the mass and radius of the Sun. Its surface has an effective temperature of 4,593 K, giving it the orange glow of a K-type star.

== Planetary system ==
In 2024, three planets were discovered orbiting HD 48948 via radial velocity using the HARPS-N spectrograph, with orbital periods of 7.3, 38 and 151 days, respectively, derived from 189 measurements over a 9.5-year period from 6 October 2013 to 16 April 2023. Of the three planets, the outermost planet, HD 48948 d, a super-Earth weighing 10.59±1.00 Earth masses, is located within the habitable zone.

The HD 48948 planetary system
Companion (in order from star)	Mass	Semimajor axis (AU)	Orbital period (days)	Eccentricity	Inclination (°)	Radius
b	>4.88±0.21 M_{🜨}	0.0652±0.0005	7.34013±0.00040	0.078+0.058 −0.050	—	—
c	>7.27±0.70 M_{🜨}	0.1951±0.0016	37.920+0.026 −0.024	0.22+0.10 −0.11	—	—
d	>10.59±1.00 M_{🜨}	0.4894±0.0042	150.95+0.45 −0.41	0.12+0.12 −0.08	—	—
