= Ocean world =

Planet containing a significant amount of water or other liquid

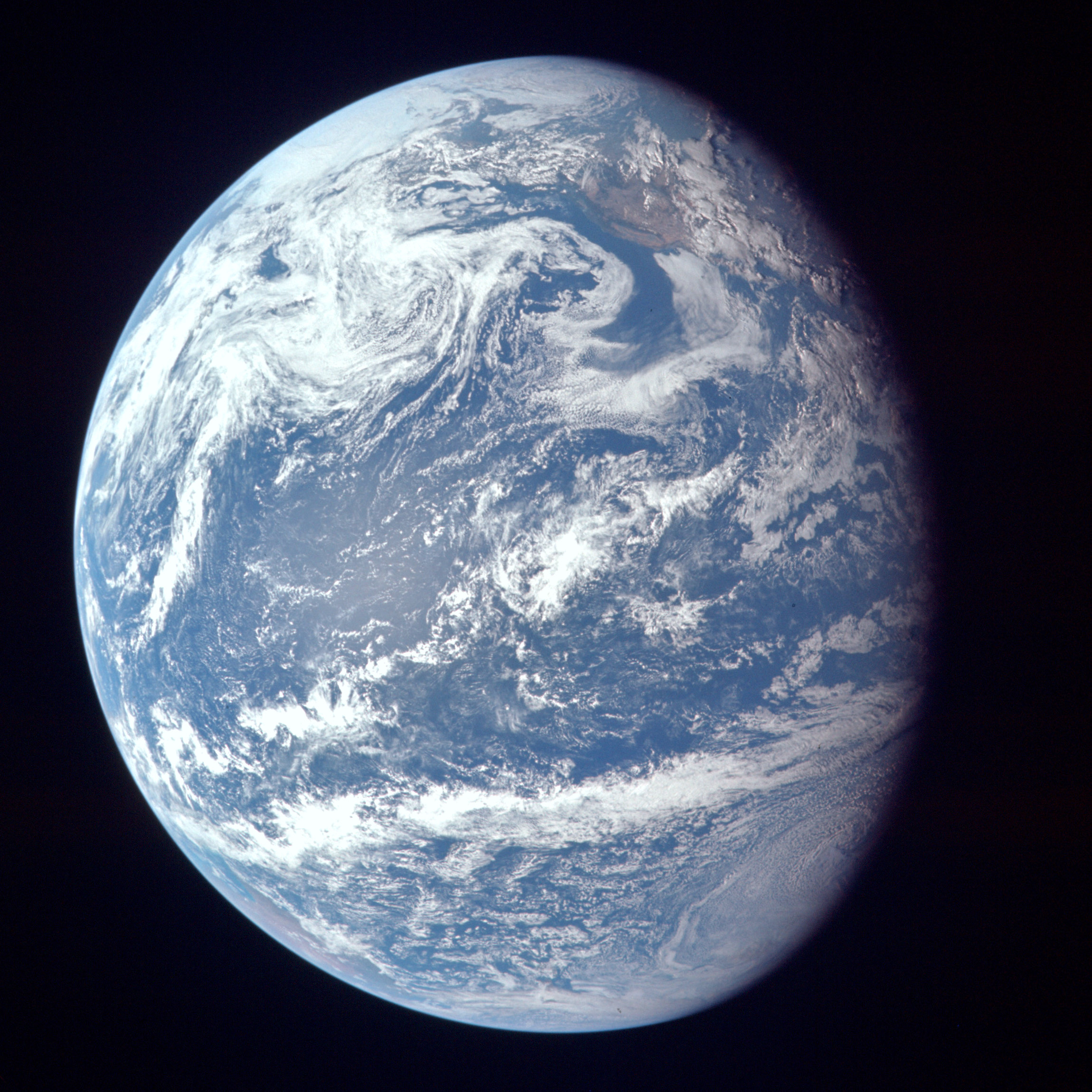
Earth's surface is dominated by the ocean, which forms 71% of Earth's surface. Thus, Earth can be considered a water world, although not a fully oceanic world.

An ocean world, ocean planet, water world, or water planet is a type of planet or moon that contains a substantial amount of water in the form of oceans, as part of its hydrosphere, either beneath the surface, as subsurface oceans, or on the surface, potentially submerging all dry land. The term ocean world is also used sometimes for astronomical objects with an ocean composed of a different fluid or thalassogen, such as lava (the case of Io), ammonia (in a eutectic mixture with water, as is likely the case of Titan's inner ocean) or hydrocarbons (like on Titan's surface, which could be the most abundant kind of exosea). The study of extraterrestrial oceans is referred to as planetary oceanography.

Earth is the only astronomical object known to presently have bodies of liquid water on its surface, although subsurface oceans are suspected to exist on Jupiter's moons Europa and Ganymede and Saturn's moons Enceladus and Titan. Several exoplanets have been found with the right conditions to support liquid water. There are also considerable amounts of subsurface water found on Earth, mostly in the form of aquifers. For exoplanets, current technology cannot directly observe liquid surface water, so atmospheric water vapor may be used as a proxy. The characteristics of ocean worlds provide clues to their history and the formation and evolution of the Solar System as a whole. Of additional interest is their potential to originate and host life.

In June 2020, NASA scientists reported that it is likely that exoplanets with oceans are common in the Milky Way galaxy, based on mathematical modeling studies.

== Overview ==
=== Definitions ===
According to Lunine, "oceans" have been defined as "stable, globe-girdling bodies of liquid water." In addition, "Ocean worlds is the label given to objects in the solar system that host stable, globe-girdling bodies of liquid water," in contrast to the terms "'ocean planet' and 'water world', both of which refer to exoplanets (planets orbiting other stars) with substantial mass fractions of water in their bulk compositions."

=== Solar System planetary bodies ===
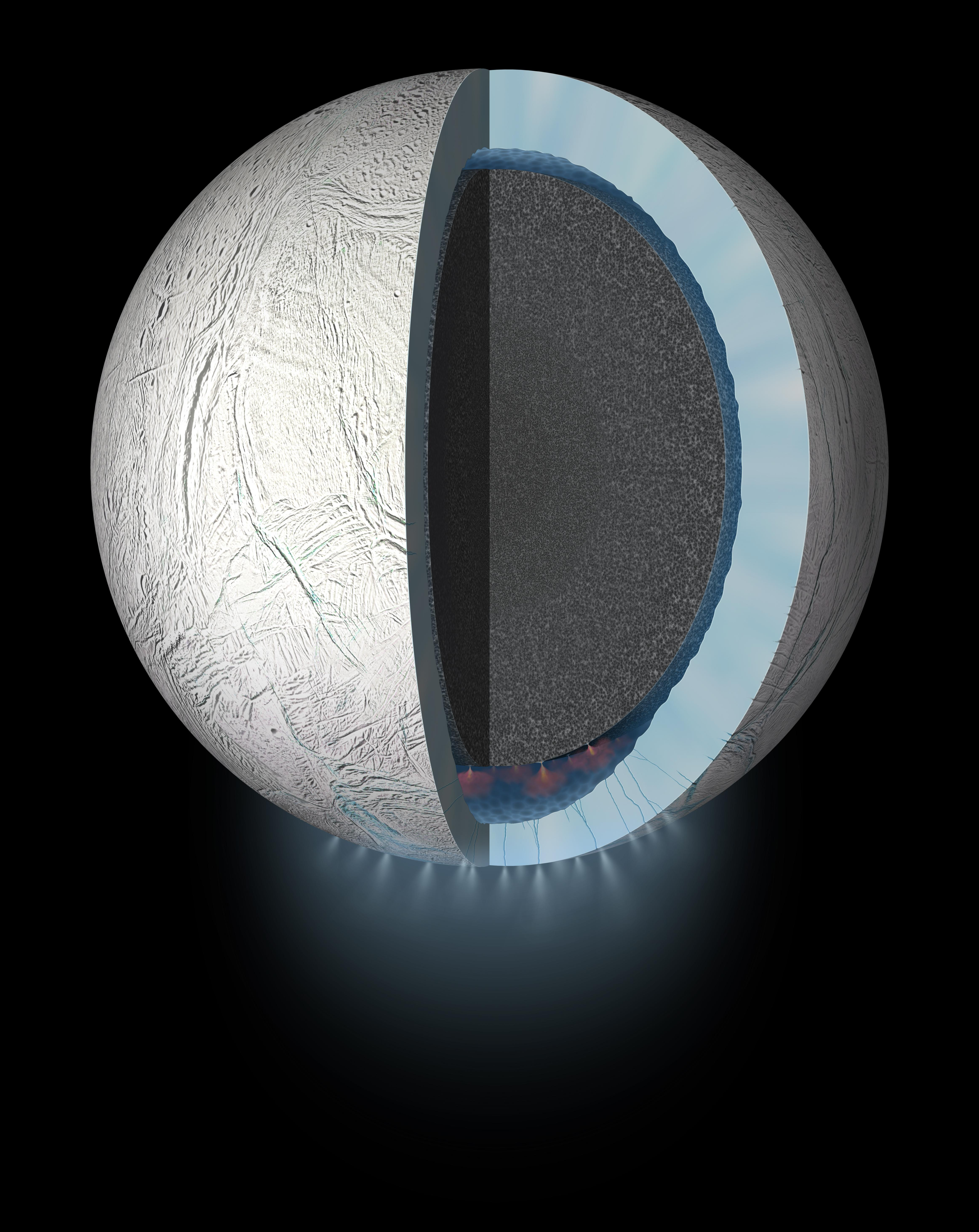
Diagram of the interior of Enceladus. Ice crust Global ocean Rocky core The southern polar region shows active jets.

Ocean worlds are of interest to astrobiologists for their potential to develop life and sustain biological activity. Major moons and dwarf planets in the Solar System thought to harbor subsurface oceans are of interest because they can be reached and studied by space probes, in contrast to exoplanets, which are light-years away, beyond the reach of current technology. The best-established water worlds in the Solar System, other than the Earth, are Callisto, Enceladus, Europa, Ganymede, and Titan. Europa and Enceladus are considered compelling targets for exploration due to their thin outer crusts and cryovolcanic features.

Other bodies in the Solar System are considered candidates to host subsurface oceans based upon a single type of observation or by theoretical modeling, including Ariel, Titania, Umbriel, Ceres, Dione, Mimas, Miranda, Oberon, Pluto, Triton, Eris, and Makemake.

=== Exoplanets ===
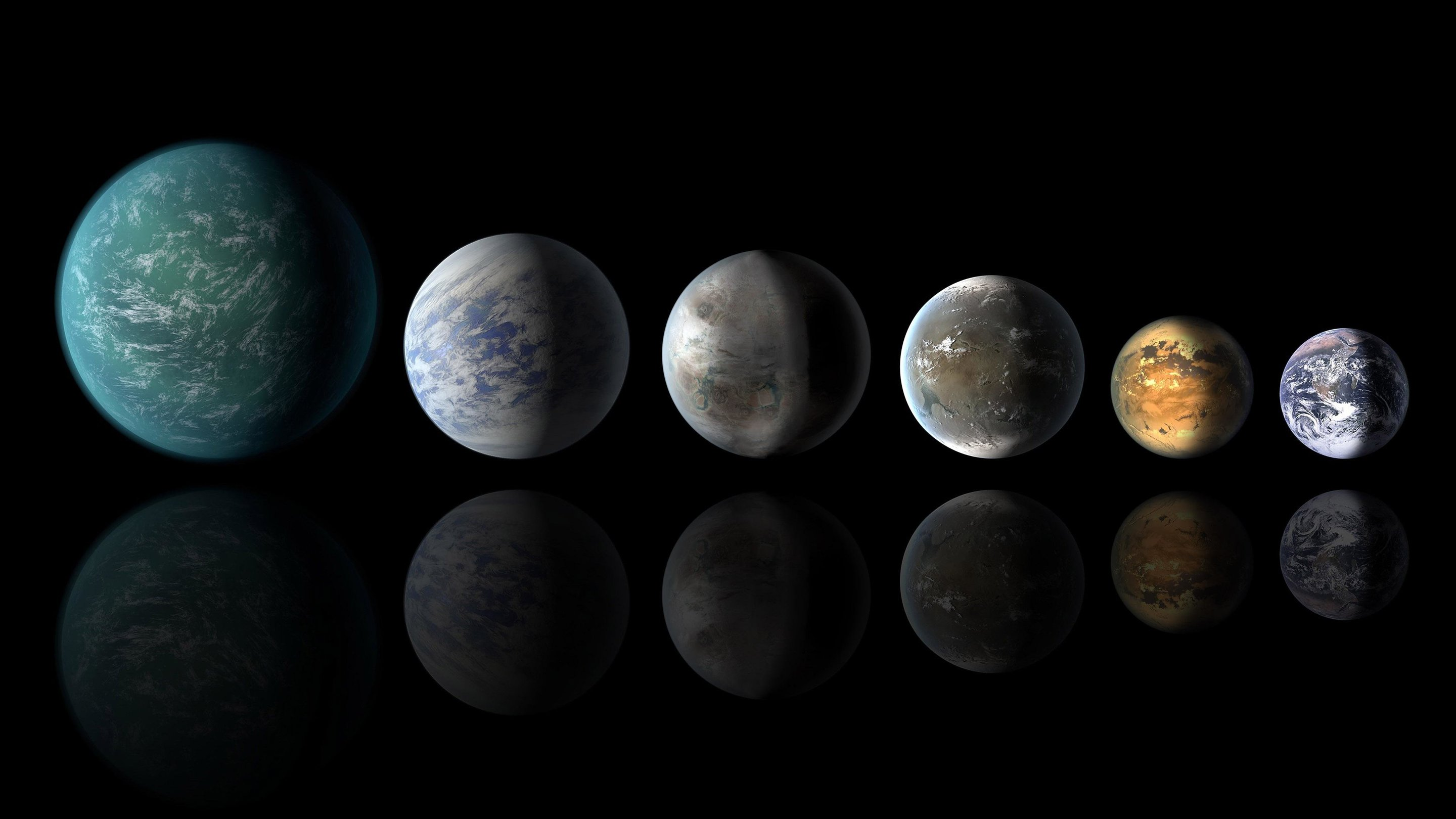
A set of exoplanets of varying size containing water, compared with the Earth (artist concept; 17 August 2018)

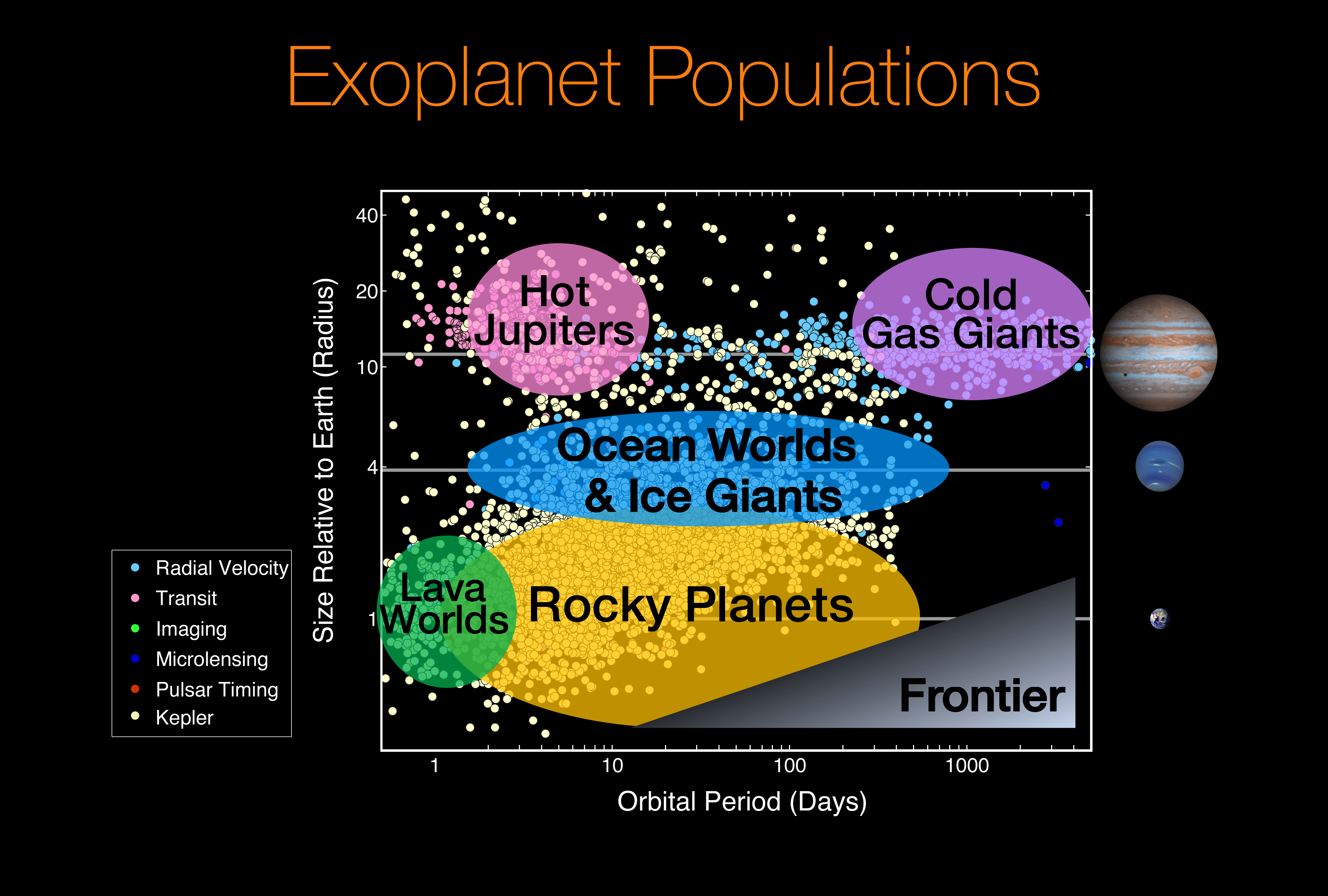
Exoplanet population with purely oceanic worlds as transition group with ice giants between gas giants and lava or rocky planets

Outside the Solar System, exoplanets that have been described as candidate ocean worlds include GJ 1214 b, Kepler-22b, Kepler-62e, Kepler-62f, and the planets of Kepler-11 and TRAPPIST-1.

More recently, the exoplanets TOI-1452 b, Kepler-138c, and Kepler-138d have been found to have densities consistent with large fractions of their mass being composed of water. Additionally, models of the massive rocky planet LHS 1140 b suggest its surface may be covered in a deep ocean.

Although 70.8% of all Earth's surface is covered in water, water accounts for only 0.05% of Earth's mass. An extraterrestrial ocean could be so deep and dense that even at high temperatures the pressure would turn the water into ice. The immense pressures of many thousands of bar in the lower regions of such oceans, could lead to the formation of a mantle of exotic forms of ice such as ice V. This ice would not necessarily be as cold as conventional ice. If the planet is close enough to its star that the water reaches its boiling point, the water will become supercritical and lack a well-defined surface. Even on cooler water-dominated planets, the atmosphere can be much thicker than that of Earth, and composed largely of water vapor, producing a very strong greenhouse effect. Such planets would have to be small enough not to be able to retain a thick envelope of hydrogen and helium, or be close enough to their primary star to be stripped of these light elements. Otherwise, they would form a warmer version of an ice giant instead, like Uranus and Neptune.

== History ==
Gravitational calculations suggested by the start of 20th century that Europa's composition was water rich, and Earth ground based observations by Gerard Kuiper revealed 1957 the water ice composition.

Important preliminary theoretical work was carried out prior to the planetary missions of the 1970s. In particular, Lewis showed in 1971 that radioactive decay alone was likely sufficient to produce subsurface oceans in large moons, especially if ammonia (NH_{3}) were present. Peale and Cassen figured out in 1979 the important role of tidal heating (aka: tidal flexing) on satellite evolution and structure. The first confirmed detection of an exoplanet was in 1992. Marc Kuchner in 2003 and Alain Léger et al figured in 2004 that a small number of icy planets that form in the region beyond the snow line can migrate inward to ~1 AU, where the outer layers subsequently melt.

The cumulative evidence collected by the Hubble Space Telescope, as well as Pioneer, Galileo, Voyager, Cassini–Huygens, and New Horizons missions, strongly indicate that several outer Solar System bodies harbour internal liquid water oceans under an insulating ice shell. Meanwhile, the Kepler space observatory, launched on March 7, 2009, has discovered thousands of exoplanets, about 50 of them of Earth-size in or near habitable zones.

Planets of many masses, sizes, and orbits have been detected, illustrating not only the variable nature of planet formation but also a subsequent migration through the circumstellar disc from the planet's place of origin. As of 8 October 2026, there are 6,534 confirmed exoplanets in 4,908 planetary systems, with 1,080 systems having more than one planet.

In June 2020, NASA scientists reported that it is likely that exoplanets with oceans may be common in the Milky Way galaxy, based on mathematical modeling studies.

In August 2022, TOI-1452 b, a super-Earth exoplanet with potential deep oceans that is 99 light-years from Earth, was discovered by the Transiting Exoplanet Survey Satellite.

== Formation ==
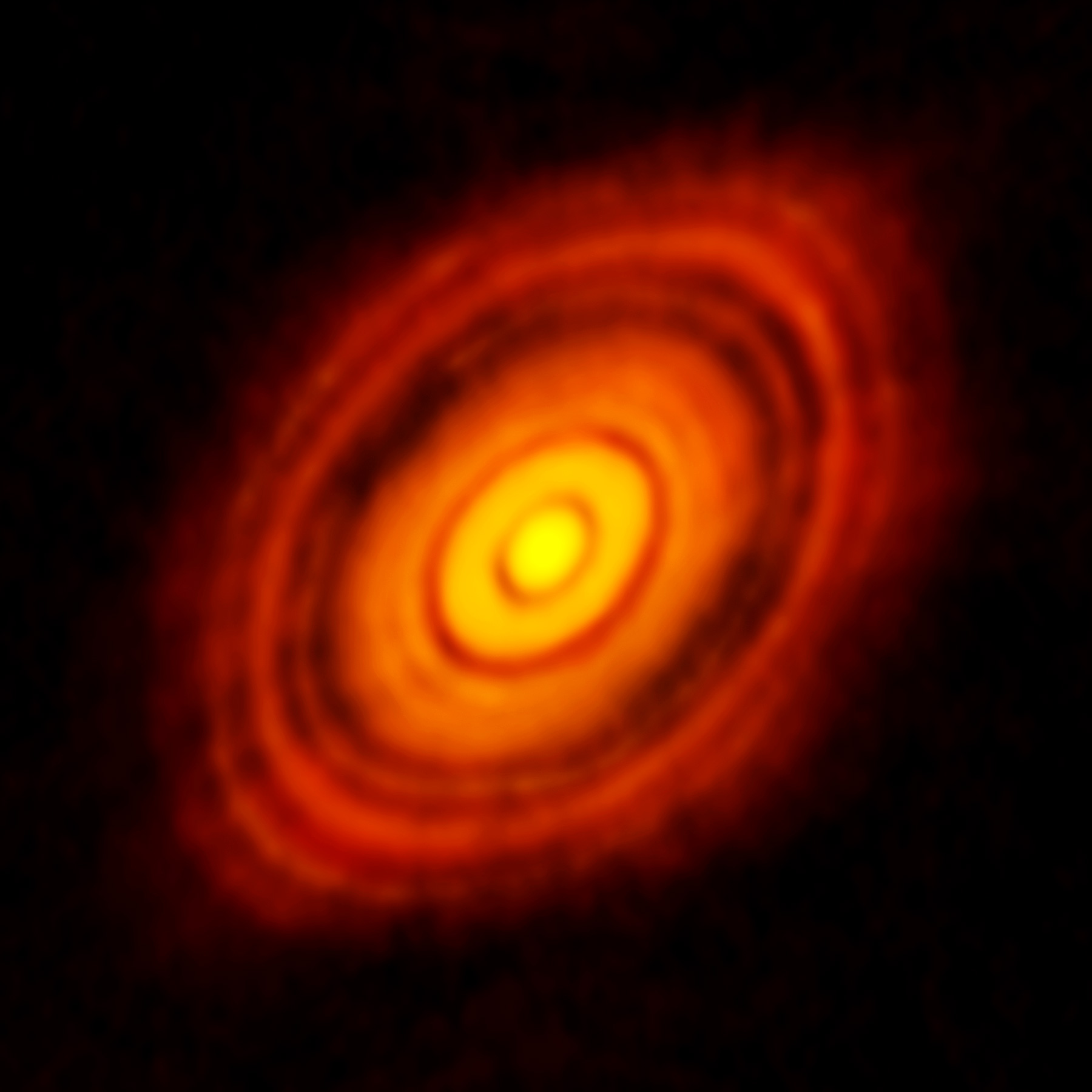
Atacama Large Millimeter Array image of HL Tauri, a protoplanetary disk

Planetary objects that form in the outer Solar System begin as a comet-like mixture of roughly half water and half rock by mass, displaying a density lower than that of rocky planets. Icy planets and moons that form near the frost line should contain mostly H_{2}O and silicates. Those that form farther out can acquire ammonia (NH_{3}) and methane (CH_{4}) as hydrates, together with CO, N_{2}, and CO_{2}.

Planets that form prior to the dissipation of the gaseous circumstellar disk experience strong torques that can induce rapid inward migration into the habitable zone, especially for planets in the terrestrial mass range. Since water is highly soluble in magma, a large fraction of the planet's water content will initially be trapped in the mantle. As the planet cools and the mantle begins to solidify from the bottom up, large amounts of water (between 60% and 99% of the total amount in the mantle) are exsolved to form a steam atmosphere, which may eventually condense to form an ocean. Ocean formation requires differentiation, and a heat source, either radioactive decay, tidal heating, or the early luminosity of the parent body. Unfortunately, the initial conditions following accretion are theoretically incomplete.

Planets that formed in the outer, water-rich regions of a disk and migrated inward are more likely to have abundant water. Conversely, planets that formed close to their host stars are less likely to have water because the primordial disks of gas and dust are thought to have hot and dry inner regions. So if a water world is found close to a star, it would be strong evidence for migration and ex situ formation, because insufficient volatiles exist near the star for in situ formation. Simulations of Solar System formation and of extra-solar system formation have shown that planets are likely to migrate inward (i.e., toward the star) as they form. Outward migration may also occur under particular conditions. Inward migration presents the possibility that icy planets could move to orbits where their ice melts into liquid form, turning them into ocean planets. This possibility was first discussed in the astronomical literature by Marc Kuchner in 2003.

== Structure ==
The internal structure of an icy astronomical body is generally deduced from measurements of its bulk density, gravity moments, and shape. Determining the moment of inertia of a body can help assess whether it has undergone differentiation (separation into rock-ice layers) or not. Shape or gravity measurements can in some cases be used to infer the moment of inertia – if the body is in hydrostatic equilibrium (i.e. behaving like a fluid on long timescales). Proving that a body is in hydrostatic equilibrium is extremely difficult, but by using a combination of shape and gravity data, the hydrostatic contributions can be deduced. Specific techniques to detect inner oceans include magnetic induction, geodesy, librations, axial tilt, tidal response, radar sounding, compositional evidence, and surface features.

Artist's cut-away representation of the internal structure of Ganymede, with a liquid water ocean "sandwiched" between two ice layers. Layers drawn to scale.

A generic icy moon will consist of a water layer sitting atop a silicate core. For a small satellite like Enceladus, an ocean will sit directly above the silicates and below a solid icy shell, but for a larger ice-rich body like Ganymede, pressures are sufficiently high that the ice at depth will transform to higher pressure phases, effectively forming a "water sandwich" with an ocean located between ice shells. An important difference between these two cases is that for the small satellite the ocean is in direct contact with the silicates, which may provide hydrothermal and chemical energy and nutrients to simple life forms. Because of the varying pressure at depth, models of a water world may include "steam, liquid, superfluid, high-pressure ices, and plasma phases" of water. Some of the solid-phase water could be in the form of ice VII.

Maintaining a subsurface ocean depends on the rate of internal heating compared with the rate at which heat is removed, and the freezing point of the liquid. Ocean survival and tidal heating are thus intimately linked.

Smaller ocean planets would have less dense atmospheres and lower gravity; thus, liquid could evaporate much more easily than on more massive ocean planets. Simulations suggest that planets and satellites of less than one Earth mass could have liquid oceans driven by hydrothermal activity, radiogenic heating, or tidal flexing. Where fluid-rock interactions propagate slowly into a deep brittle layer, thermal energy from serpentinization may be the primary cause of hydrothermal activity in small ocean planets. The dynamics of global oceans beneath tidally flexing ice shells represents a significant set of challenges which have barely begun to be explored. The extent to which cryovolcanism occurs is a subject of some debate, as water, being denser than ice by about 8%, has difficulty erupting under normal circumstances. Nevertheless, imaging data from the Voyager 2, Cassini-Huygens, Galileo and New Horizons spacecraft revealed cryovolcanic surface features on several of the icy bodies in our own solar system. Recent studies suggest that cryovolcanism may occur on ocean planets that harbor internal oceans beneath layers of surface ice as it does on the icy moons Enceladus and Europa in our own solar system.

Liquid water oceans on extrasolar planets could be significantly deeper than the Earth's ocean, which has an average depth of 3.7 km. Depending on the planet's gravity and surface conditions, exoplanet oceans could be up to hundreds of times deeper. For example, a planet with a 300 K surface can possess liquid water oceans with depths from 30 to 500 km, depending on its mass and composition.

== Atmospheric models ==
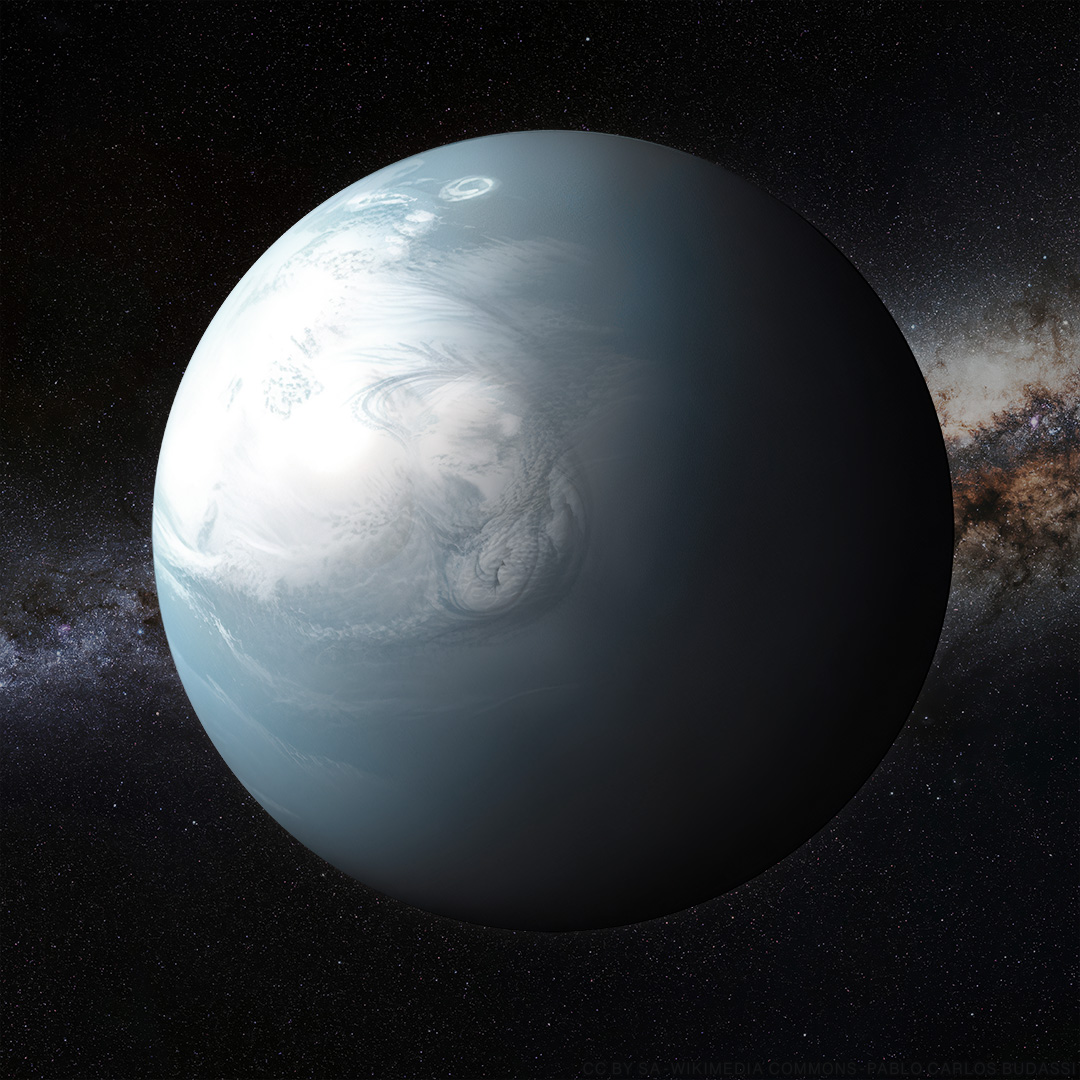
Artist depiction of a hycean planet, a large ocean world with a hydrogen atmosphere

To allow surface water to be liquid for long periods of time, a planet—or moon—must orbit within the habitable zone (HZ), possess a protective magnetic field, and have the gravitational pull needed to retain an ample amount of atmospheric pressure. If the planet's gravity cannot sustain that, then all the water will eventually evaporate into outer space. A strong planetary magnetosphere, maintained by internal dynamo action in an electrically conducting fluid layer, is helpful for shielding the upper atmosphere from stellar wind mass loss and retaining water over long geological time scales.

A planet's atmosphere forms from outgassing during planet formation or is gravitationally captured from the surrounding protoplanetary nebula. The surface temperature on an exoplanet is governed by the atmosphere's greenhouse gases (or lack thereof), so an atmosphere can be detectable in the form of upwelling infrared radiation because the greenhouse gases absorb and re-radiate energy from the host star. Ice-rich planets that have migrated inward into orbit too close to their host stars may develop thick steamy atmospheres but still retain their volatiles for billions of years, even if their atmospheres undergo slow hydrodynamic escape. Ultraviolet photons are not only biologically harmful but can drive fast atmospheric escape that leads to the erosion of planetary atmospheres; photolysis of water vapor, and hydrogen/oxygen escape to space can lead to the loss of several Earth oceans of water from planets throughout the habitable zone, regardless of whether the escape is energy-limited or diffusion-limited. The amount of water lost seems proportional with the planet mass, since the diffusion-limited hydrogen escape flux is proportional to the planet surface gravity.

During a runaway greenhouse effect, water vapor reaches the stratosphere, where it is easily broken down (photolyzed) by ultraviolet radiation (UV). Heating of the upper atmosphere by UV radiation can then drive a hydrodynamic wind that carries the hydrogen (and potentially some of the oxygen) to space, leading to the irreversible loss of a planet's surface water, oxidation of the surface, and possible accumulation of oxygen in the atmosphere. The fate of a given planet's atmosphere strongly depends on the extreme ultraviolet flux, the duration of the runaway regime, the initial water content, and the rate at which oxygen is absorbed by the surface. Volatile-rich planets should be more common in the habitable zones of young stars and M-type stars.

Scientists have proposed Hycean planets, ocean planets with a thick atmosphere made mainly of hydrogen. Those planets would have a wide range area around their star where they could orbit and have liquid water. However, those models worked on rather simplistic approaches to the planetary atmosphere. More complex studies showed that hydrogen reacts differently to starlight's wavelengths than heavier elements like nitrogen and oxygen. If such a planet, with an atmospheric pressure 10 to 20 heavier than Earth's, was located at 1 astronomical unit (AU) from their star their water bodies would boil. Those studies now place the habitable zone of such worlds at 3.85 AU, and 1.6 AU if it had a similar atmospheric pressure to Earth.

=== Composition models ===
There are challenges in examining an exoplanetary surface and its atmosphere, as cloud coverage influences the atmospheric temperature, structure as well as the observability of spectral features. However, planets composed of large quantities of water that reside in the habitable zone (HZ) are expected to have distinct geophysics and geochemistry of their surface and atmosphere. For example, in the case of exoplanets Kepler-62e and -62f, they could possess a liquid ocean outer surface, a steam atmosphere, or a full cover of surface Ice I, depending on their orbit within the HZ and the magnitude of their greenhouse effect. Several other surface and interior processes affect the atmospheric composition, including but not limited to the ocean fraction for dissolution of CO_{2} and for atmospheric relative humidity, redox state of the planetary surface and interior, acidity levels of the oceans, planetary albedo, and surface gravity.

The atmospheric structure, as well as the resulting HZ limits, depend on the density of a planet's atmosphere, shifting the HZ outward for lower mass and inward for higher mass planets. Theory, as well as computer models suggest that atmospheric composition for water planets in the habitable zone (HZ) should not differ substantially from those of land-ocean planets. For modeling purposes, it is assumed that the initial composition of icy planetesimals that assemble into water planets is similar to that of comets: mostly water (H_{2}O), and some ammonia (NH_{3}), and carbon dioxide (CO_{2}). An initial composition of ice similar to that of comets leads to an atmospheric model composition of 90% H_{2}O, 5% NH_{3}, and 5% CO_{2}.

Atmospheric models for Kepler-62f show that an atmospheric pressure of between 1.6 bar and 5 bar of CO_{2} are needed to warm the surface temperature above freezing, leading to a scaled surface pressure of 0.56–1.32 times Earth's.

== Oceanography ==
It is suggested that strong ocean currents exist in Enceladus, Titan, Ganymede, and Europa. In Enceladus, oceanic heat flux inferred from ice shell thickness suggests the upwelling of warm water at the poles and downwelling of colder water at low latitudes. Europa is predicted to have an equatorial upwelling of warm water with greater heat transfer at low latitudes. Global scale currents are organized into three zonal and two equatorial circulation cells, convecting internal heat toward the surface, especially in equatorial regions. Titan and Ganymede are hypothesized to behave as a non-rotating system and have no coherent heat transfer patterns.

== Astrobiology ==
The characteristics of ocean worlds or ocean planets provide clues to their history, and the formation and evolution of the Solar System as a whole. Of additional interest is their potential to form and host life. Life as we know it requires liquid water, a source of energy, and nutrients, and all three key requirements can potentially be satisfied within some of these bodies, that may offer the possibility for sustaining simple biological activity over geological timescales. In August 2018, researchers reported that water worlds could support life.

An ocean world's habitation by Earth-like life is limited if the planet is completely covered by liquid water at the surface, even more restricted if a pressurized, solid ice layer is located between the global ocean and the lower rocky mantle. Simulations of a hypothetical ocean world covered by five Earth oceans' worth of water indicate the water would not contain enough phosphorus and other nutrients for Earth-like oxygen-producing ocean organisms such as plankton to evolve. On Earth, phosphorus is washed into the oceans by rainwater hitting rocks on exposed land, so the mechanism would not work on an ocean world. Simulations of ocean planets with 50 Earth oceans' worth of water indicate the pressure on the sea floor would be so immense that the planet's interior would not sustain plate tectonics to cause volcanism to provide the right chemical environment for terrestrial life.

On the other hand, small bodies such as Europa and Enceladus are regarded as particularly habitable environments because the theorized locations of their oceans would almost certainly leave them in direct contact with the underlying silicate core, a potential source of both heat and biologically important chemical elements. The surface geological activity of these bodies may also lead to the transport to the oceans of biologically important building blocks implanted at the surface, such as organic molecules from comets or tholins, formed by solar ultraviolet irradiation of simple organic compounds such as methane or ethane, often in combination with nitrogen.

=== Oxygen ===
Molecular oxygen (O_{2}) can be produced by geophysical processes, as well as a byproduct of photosynthesis by life forms, so although encouraging, O_{2} is not a reliable biosignature. In fact, planets with high concentration of O_{2} in their atmosphere may be uninhabitable. Abiogenesis in the presence of massive amounts of atmospheric oxygen could be difficult because early organisms relied on the free energy available in redox reactions involving a variety of hydrogen compounds; on an O_{2}-rich planet, organisms would have to compete with the oxygen for this free energy.

== See also ==
- List of ocean worlds
- Circumstellar habitable zone – Orbits where planets may have liquid surface water
- Desert planet – Rocky planet whose surface is dominated by desert
- Earth analog – Planet with environment similar to Earth's
- Extraterrestrial liquid water – Liquid water naturally occurring outside Earth
- Ice planet – Planet with an icy surface
- List of extrasolar candidates for liquid water
- Ocean § Extraterrestrial oceans – Body of salt water covering most of Earth
- Panthalassa – Prehistoric superocean that surrounded Pangaea
- Subnautica – 2018 video game
- TOI-1452 b – Super-Earth orbiting TOI-1452

Astrobiology mission concepts to water worlds in the outer Solar System:

- Enceladus Explorer – Planned interplanetary orbiter and lander mission
- Enceladus Life Finder (ELF) – Proposed NASA mission to a moon of Saturn
- Europa Lander – Cancelled NASA lander for Europa
- Explorer of Enceladus and Titan (E^{2}T) – NASA/ESA Saturnian moon probe concept
- Journey to Enceladus and Titan (JET) – Proposed NASA mission to Saturn's moons
- Jupiter Icy Moons Explorer (JUICE) – European mission to study Jupiter and its moons since 2023
- Laplace-P – Proposed Russian spacecraft to study the Jovian moon system and land on Ganymede
- Life Investigation For Enceladus (LIFE) – Proposed astrobiology mission
- Oceanus – Proposed NASA Titan orbiter mission
- Testing the Habitability of Enceladus's Ocean (THEO) – Orbiter mission to Enceladus
- Titan Lake In-situ Sampling Propelled Explorer (TALISE) – Proposed space mission
- Titan Mare Explorer (TiME) – Proposed spacecraft lander design
- Triton Hopper – Proposed NASA Triton lander space probe
