= Planetary oceanography =

Study of extraterrestrial oceans

Planetary oceanography, also called astro-oceanography or exo-oceanography, is the study of oceans on planets and moons other than Earth. This field developed after the discovery of sub-surface oceans in Saturn's moon Titan and Jupiter's moon Europa during the Voyager missions. The Cassini mission observed surface lakes of liquid methane on Titan, and directly sampled a plume of sub-surface ocean water from Enceladus.

Early in their geologic histories, Mars and Venus are theorized to have had large water oceans. The Mars ocean hypothesis suggests that nearly a third of the surface of Mars was once covered by water, and a runaway greenhouse effect may have boiled away the global ocean of Venus. Compounds such as salts and ammonia, when dissolved in water, will lower water's freezing point, so that water might exist in large quantities in extraterrestrial environments as brine, or convecting ice. Oceans are thought to exist beneath the surfaces of many dwarf planets and natural satellites; notably, the ocean of the moon Europa is estimated to have over twice the water volume of Earth's.

The Solar System's giant planets are thought to have liquid or supercritical atmospheric layers of yet-to-be-confirmed compositions. Oceans may also exist on exoplanets and exomoons, including surface oceans of liquid water within a circumstellar habitable zone. Ocean planets are a hypothetical type of planet with a surface completely covered with liquid.

Extraterrestrial oceans may be composed of water, or other elements and compounds. The only confirmed large, stable bodies of extraterrestrial surface liquids are the lakes of Titan, which are made of hydrocarbons instead of water. However, there is strong evidence for the existence of subsurface water oceans elsewhere in the Solar System. The best-established candidates for subsurface water oceans in the Solar System are Jupiter's moons Europa, Ganymede, and Callisto, and Saturn's moons Enceladus and Titan.

Although Earth is the only known planet with large stable bodies of liquid water on its surface, and the only such planet in the Solar System, other celestial bodies are thought to have large oceans. In June 2020, NASA scientists reported that it is likely that exoplanets with oceans may be common in the Milky Way galaxy, based on mathematical modeling studies.

The inner structure of gas giants remain poorly understood. Scientists suspect that, under extreme pressure, hydrogen would act as a supercritical fluid, hence the likelihood of oceans of liquid hydrogen deep in the interior of gas giants like Jupiter. Oceans of liquid carbon have been hypothesized to exist on ice giants, notably Neptune and Uranus. Magma oceans exist during periods of accretion on any planet and some natural satellites when the planet or natural satellite is completely or partly molten.

== Extraterrestrial oceans ==
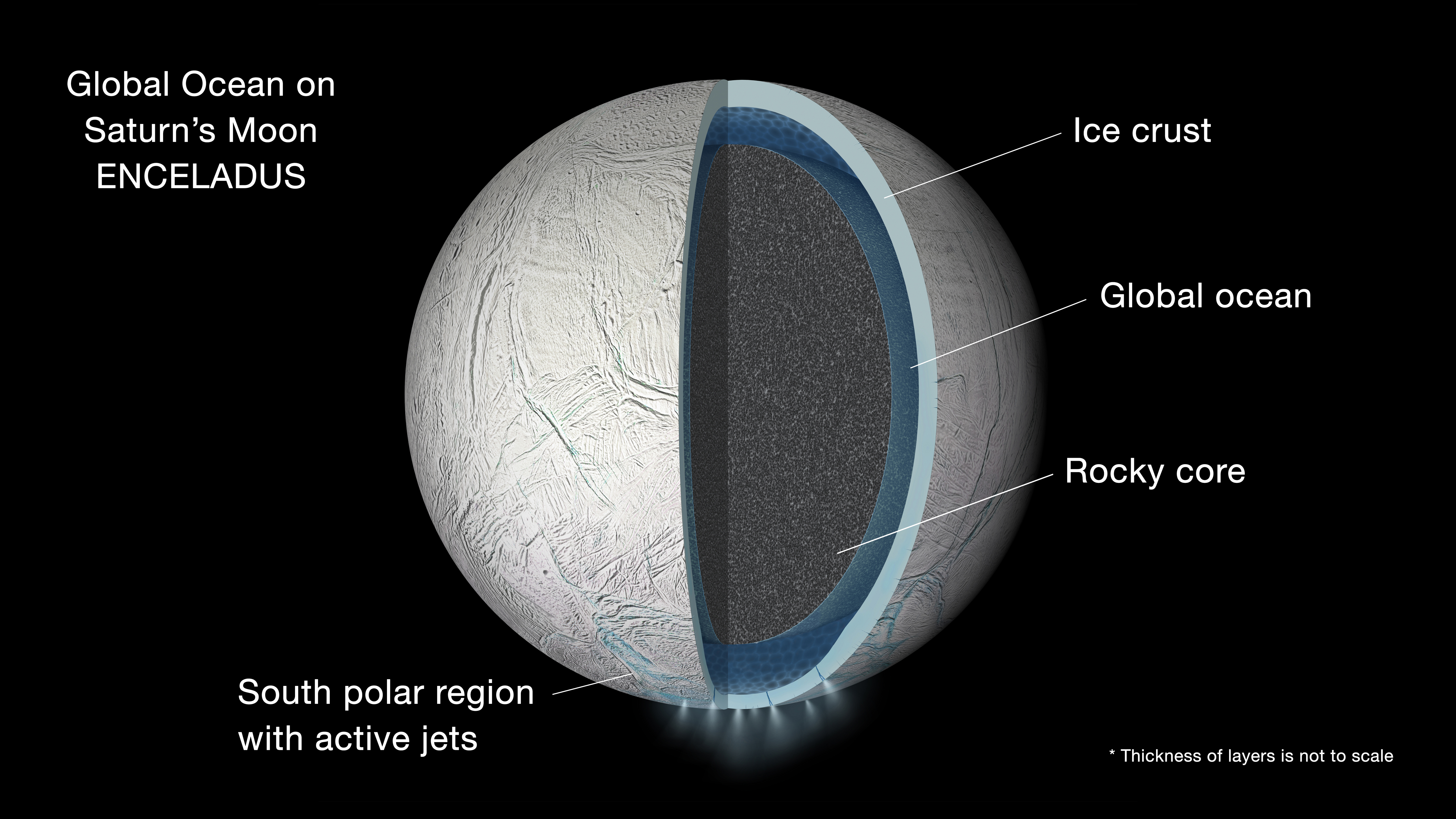
Artist's conception of subsurface ocean of Enceladus confirmed April 3, 2014

Diagram of Europa's interior showing its global subsurface ocean

=== Planets ===
The gas giants, Jupiter and Saturn, are thought to lack surfaces and instead have a stratum of liquid hydrogen; however their planetary geology is not well understood. The possibility of the ice giants Uranus and Neptune having hot, highly compressed, supercritical water under their thick atmospheres has been hypothesised. Although their composition is still not fully understood, a 2006 study by Wiktorowicz and Ingersall ruled out the possibility of such a water "ocean" existing on Neptune, though oceans of metallic liquid carbon are possible.

The Mars ocean hypothesis suggests that nearly a third of the surface of Mars was once covered by water, though the water on Mars is no longer oceanic (much of it residing in the ice caps). The possibility continues to be studied along with reasons for their apparent disappearance. Some astronomers now propose that Venus may have had liquid water and perhaps oceans for over 2 billion years. According to Lunine, "oceans" are defined as "stable, globe-girdling bodies of liquid water."

=== Natural satellites ===
A global layer of liquid water thick enough to decouple the crust from the mantle is thought to be present on the natural satellites Titan, Europa, Enceladus, Ganymede, and Triton; and, with less certainty, in Callisto, Mimas, Miranda, and Ariel. A magma ocean is thought to be present on Io. Geysers or fumaroles have been found on Saturn's moon Enceladus, possibly originating from an ocean about 10 kilometers (6 mi) beneath the surface ice shell. Other icy moons may also have internal oceans, or may once have had internal oceans that have now frozen.

Large bodies of liquid hydrocarbons are thought to be present on the surface of Titan, although they are not large enough to be considered oceans and are sometimes referred to as lakes or seas. The Cassini–Huygens space mission initially discovered only what appeared to be dry lakebeds and empty river channels, suggesting that Titan had lost what surface liquids it might have had. Later flybys of Titan provided radar and infrared images that showed a series of hydrocarbon lakes in the colder polar regions. Titan is thought to have a subsurface liquid-water ocean under the ice in addition to the hydrocarbon mix that forms atop its outer crust. Additionally, Mimas is hypothesized to have a subsurface liquid-water ocean underneath its icy crust due to its crust moving as it rotates around Saturn, though any solid proof of such an ocean is as of now unconfirmed.

=== Dwarf planets and trans-Neptunian objects ===
Diagram showing a possible internal structure of Ceres

Ceres appears to be differentiated into a rocky core and icy mantle and may harbour a liquid-water ocean under its surface.

Not enough is known of the larger trans-Neptunian objects to determine whether they are differentiated bodies capable of supporting oceans, although models of radioactive decay suggest that Pluto, Eris, Sedna, and Orcus have oceans beneath solid icy crusts approximately 100 to 180 kilometers (60 to 110 mi) thick. In June 2020, astronomers reported evidence that the dwarf planet Pluto may have had a subsurface ocean, and consequently may have been habitable, when it was first formed.

=== Extrasolar ===
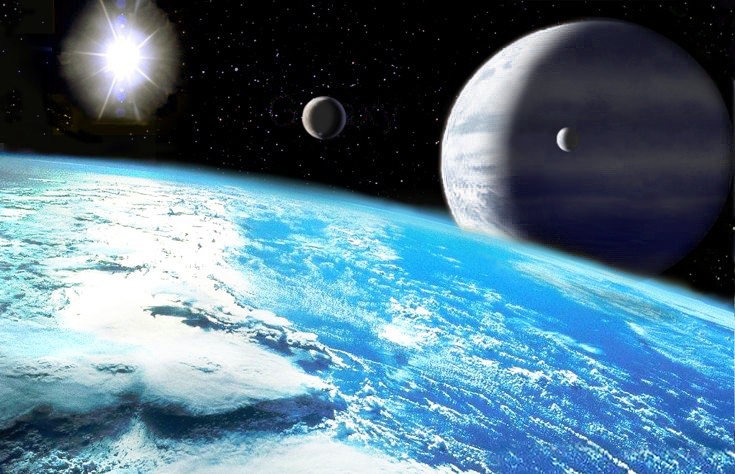
Rendering of a hypothetical large extrasolar moon with surface liquid-water oceans

Some planets and natural satellites outside the Solar System are likely to have (subsurface) oceans, including possible water ocean planets similar to Earth in the habitable zone or "liquid-water belt". The detection of oceans, even through the spectroscopy method, however is likely extremely difficult and inconclusive.

Theoretical models have been used to predict with high probability that GJ 1214 b, detected by transit, is composed of exotic form of ice VII, making up 75% of its mass, making it an ocean planet.

Other possible candidates are merely speculative based on their mass and position in the habitable zone include planet though little is actually known of their composition. Some scientists speculate Kepler-22b may be an "ocean-like" planet. Models have been proposed for Gliese 581 d that could include surface oceans. Gliese 436 b is speculated to have an ocean of "hot ice". Exomoons orbiting planets, particularly gas giants within their parent star's habitable zone may theoretically have surface oceans.

Terrestrial planets will acquire water during their accretion, some of which will be buried in the magma ocean but most of it will go into a steam atmosphere, and when the atmosphere cools it will collapse on to the surface forming an ocean. There will also be outgassing of water from the mantle as the magma solidifies—this will happen even for planets with a low percentage of their mass composed of water, so "super-Earth exoplanets may be expected to commonly produce water oceans within tens to hundreds of millions of years of their last major accretionary impact."

== Non-water surface liquids ==
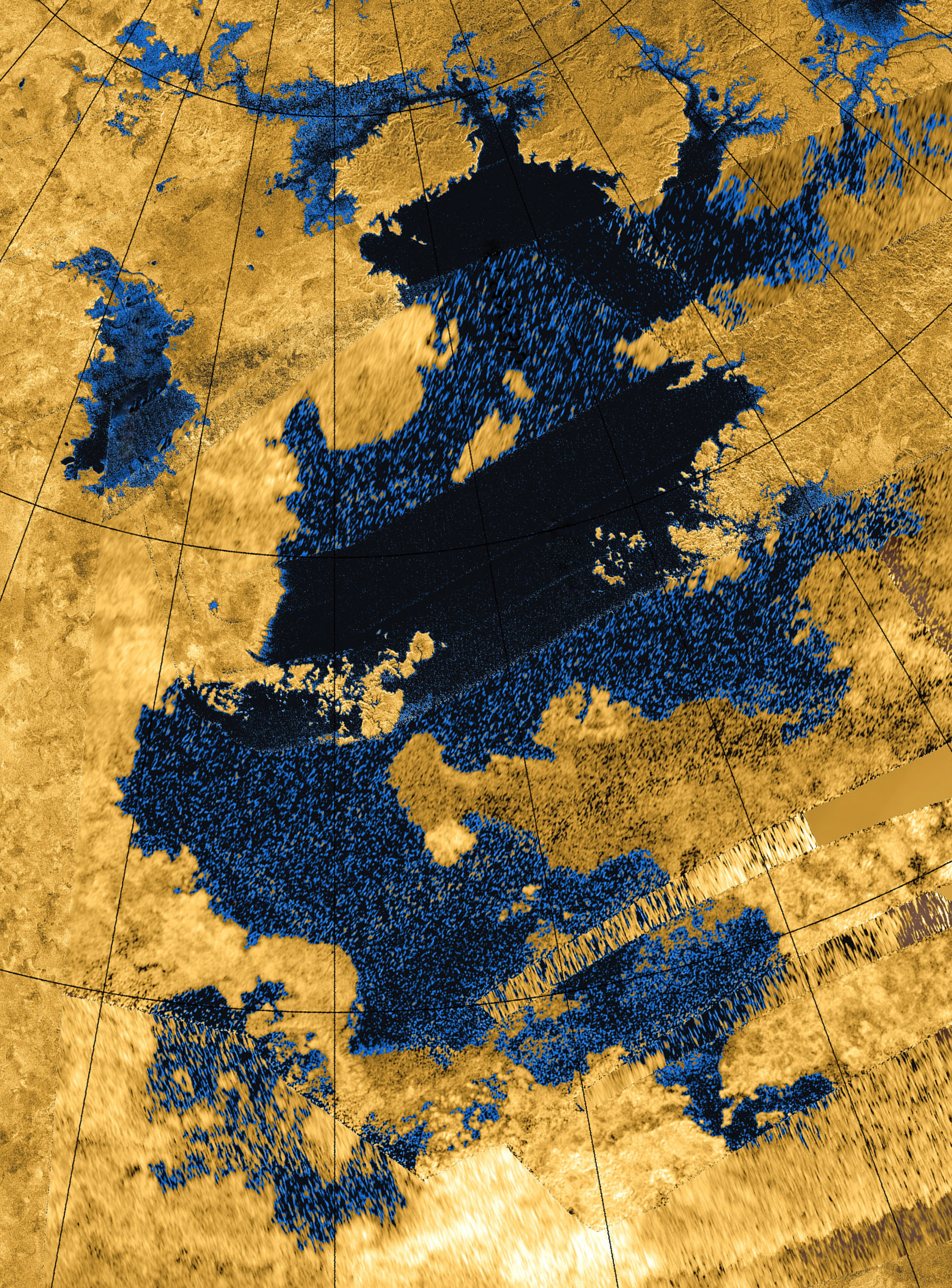
False-color mosaic of synthetic aperture radar of Kraken Mare on Titan, the largest known body of surface liquid beside Earth's Ocean. The large island Mayda Insula is left of top center, and Jingpo Lacus is at upper left. A portion of Ligeia Mare enters the view at top right.

Oceans, seas, lakes and other bodies of liquids can be composed of liquids other than water, for example the hydrocarbon lakes on Titan. The possibility of seas of nitrogen on Triton was also considered but ruled out. There is evidence that the icy surfaces of the moons Ganymede, Callisto, Europa, Titan and Enceladus are shells floating on oceans of very dense liquid water or water–ammonia solution.

Extrasolar terrestrial planets that are extremely close to their parent star will be tidally locked and so one half of the planet will be a magma ocean. It is also possible that terrestrial planets had magma oceans at some point during their formation as a result of giant impacts. Hot Neptunes close to their star could lose their atmospheres via hydrodynamic escape, leaving behind their cores with various liquids on the surface. Where there are suitable temperatures and pressures, volatile chemicals that might exist as liquids in abundant quantities on planets (thalassogens) include ammonia, argon, carbon disulfide, ethane, hydrazine, hydrogen, hydrogen cyanide, hydrogen sulfide, methane, neon, nitrogen, nitric oxide, phosphine, silane, sulfuric acid, and water.

Supercritical fluids, although not liquids, do share various properties with liquids. Underneath the thick atmospheres of the planets Uranus and Neptune, it is expected that these planets are composed of oceans of hot high-density fluid mixtures of water, ammonia and other volatiles. The gaseous outer layers of Jupiter and Saturn transition smoothly into oceans of supercritical hydrogen. The atmosphere of Venus is 96.5% carbon dioxide, and is a supercritical fluid at the surface.

== See also ==
- Extraterrestrial liquid water
- Lava planet
- List of largest lakes and seas in the Solar System
- Magma ocean
- Ocean world
- List of ocean worlds
