= Ground-penetrating radar =

Geophysical method that uses radar pulses to image the subsurface

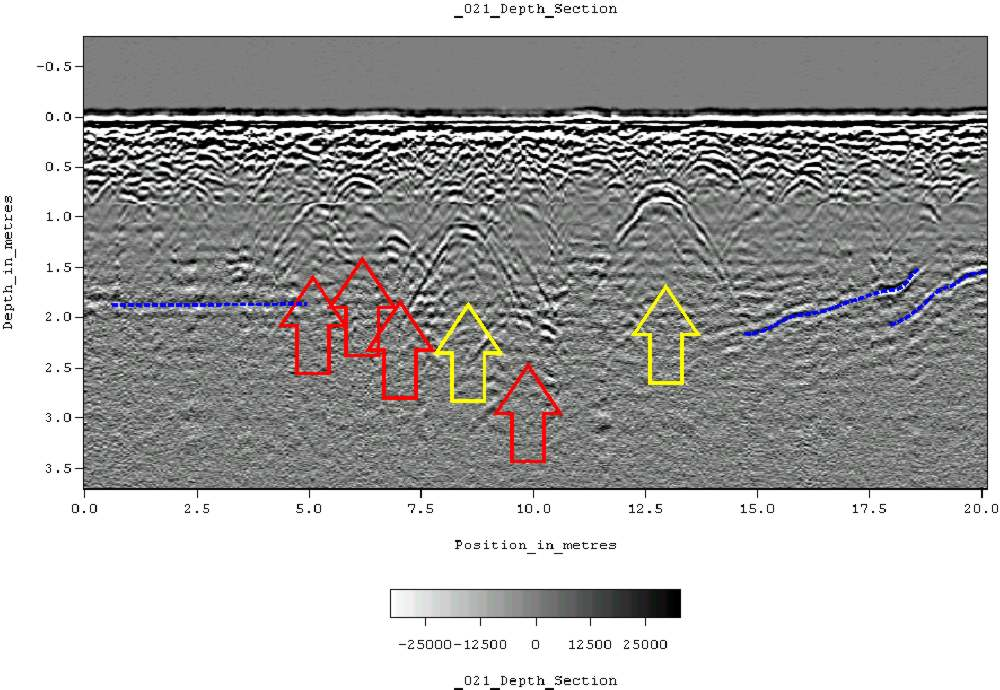
A ground-penetrating radargram collected on a historic cemetery in Alabama, US. Hyperbolic arrivals (arrows) indicate the presence of diffractors buried beneath the surface, possibly associated with human burials. Reflections from soil layering are also present (dashed lines).

Ground-penetrating radar (GPR) is a geophysical method that uses radar pulses to image the subsurface. It is a non-intrusive method of surveying the sub-surface to investigate underground utilities such as concrete, asphalt, metals, pipes, cables or masonry. This nondestructive method uses electromagnetic radiation in the microwave band (UHF/VHF frequencies) of the radio spectrum, and detects the reflected signals from subsurface structures. GPR can have applications in a variety of media, including rock, soil, ice, fresh water, pavements and structures. In the right conditions, practitioners can use GPR to detect subsurface objects, changes in material properties, and voids and cracks.

GPR uses high-frequency (usually polarized) radio waves, usually in the range 10 MHz to 2.6 GHz. A GPR transmitter and antenna emits electromagnetic energy into the ground. When the energy encounters a buried object or a boundary between materials having different permittivities, it may be reflected or refracted or scattered back to the surface. A receiving antenna can then record the variations in the return signal. The principles involved are similar to seismology, except GPR methods implement electromagnetic energy rather than acoustic energy, and energy may be reflected at boundaries where subsurface electrical properties change rather than subsurface mechanical properties as is the case with seismic energy.

The electrical conductivity of the ground, the transmitted center frequency, and the radiated power all may limit the effective depth range of GPR investigation. Increases in electrical conductivity attenuate the introduced electromagnetic wave, and thus the penetration depth decreases. Because of frequency-dependent attenuation mechanisms, higher frequencies do not penetrate as far as lower frequencies. However, higher frequencies may provide improved resolution. Thus operating frequency is always a trade-off between resolution and penetration. Optimal depth of subsurface penetration is achieved in ice where the depth of penetration can achieve several thousand metres (to bedrock in Greenland) at low GPR frequencies. Dry sandy soils or massive dry materials such as granite, limestone, and concrete tend to be resistive rather than conductive, and the depth of penetration could be up to 15 metres (50 ft). However, in moist or clay-laden soils and materials with high electrical conductivity, penetration may be as little as a few centimetres.

Ground-penetrating radar antennas are generally in contact with the ground for the strongest signal strength; however, GPR air-launched antennas can be used above the ground.

Cross borehole GPR has developed within the field of hydrogeophysics to be a valuable means of assessing the presence and amount of soil water.

== History ==
The first patent for a system designed to use continuous-wave radar to locate buried objects was submitted by Gotthelf Leimbach and Heinrich Löwy in 1910, six years after the first patent for radar itself (patent DE 237 944). A patent for a system using radar pulses rather than a continuous wave was filed in 1926 by Dr. Hülsenbeck (DE 489 434), leading to improved depth resolution. A glacier's depth was measured using ground penetrating radar in 1929 by W. Stern.

Further developments in the field remained sparse until the 1970s, when military applications began driving research. Commercial applications followed and the first affordable consumer equipment was sold in 1975.

In 1972, the Apollo 17 mission carried a ground penetrating radar called ALSE (Apollo Lunar Sounder Experiment) in orbit around the Moon. It was able to record depth information up to 1.3 km and recorded the results on film due to the lack of suitable computer storage at the time.

== Applications ==
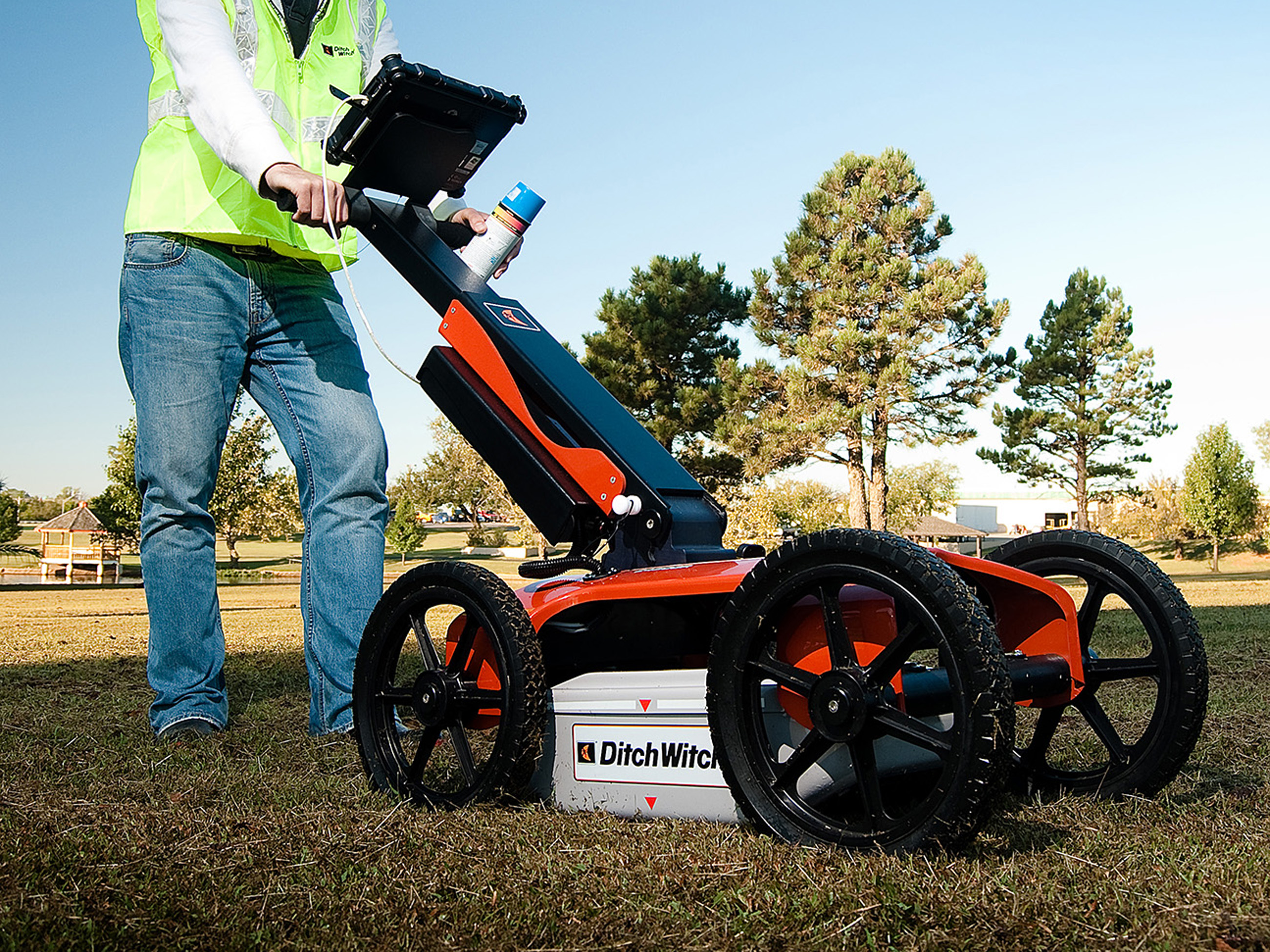
Ground penetrating radar in use near Stillwater, Oklahoma, US in 2010

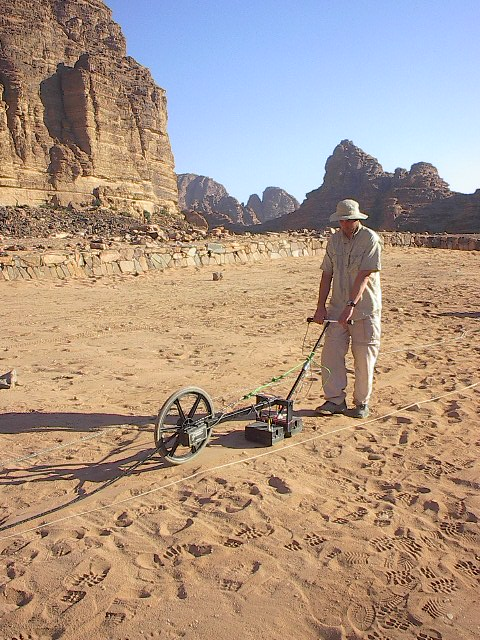
Ground penetrating radar survey of an archaeological site in Jordan

GPR has many applications in a number of fields. In the Earth sciences it is used to study bedrock, soils, groundwater, and ice. It is of some utility in prospecting for gold nuggets and for diamonds in alluvial gravel beds, by finding natural traps in buried stream beds that have the potential for accumulating heavier particles. The Chinese lunar rover Yutu has a GPR on its underside to investigate the soil and crust of the Moon.

Engineering applications include nondestructive testing (NDT) of structures and pavements, locating buried structures and utility lines, and studying soils and bedrock. In environmental remediation, GPR is used to define landfills, contaminant plumes, and other remediation sites, while in archaeology it is used for mapping archaeological features and cemeteries. GPR is used in law enforcement for locating clandestine graves and buried evidence. Military uses include detection of mines, unexploded ordnance, and tunnels.

Borehole radars using GPR are used to map the structures from a borehole in underground mining applications. Modern directional borehole radar systems are able to produce three-dimensional images from measurements in a single borehole.

One of the other main applications for ground-penetrating radars is for locating underground utilities. Standard electromagnetic induction utility locating tools require utilities to be conductive. These tools are ineffective for locating plastic conduits or concrete storm and sanitary sewers. Since GPR detects variations in dielectric properties in the subsurface, it can be highly effective for locating non-conductive utilities.

GPR was often used on the Channel 4 television programme Time Team which used the technology to determine a suitable area for examination by means of excavations. GPR was also used to recover £150,000 in cash ransom that Michael Sams had buried in a field, following his 1992 kidnapping of an estate agent.

=== Military ===
Military applications of ground-penetrating radar include detection of unexploded ordnance and detecting tunnels. In military applications and other common GPR applications, practitioners often use GPR in conjunction with other available geophysical techniques such as electrical resistivity and electromagnetic induction methods.

In May 2020, the US military ordered ground-penetrating radar system from Chemring Sensors and Electronics Systems (CSES), to detect improvised explosive devices (IEDs) buried in roadways, in $200.2 million deal.

=== Vehicle localization ===
Researchers have demonstrated an approach to vehicle localization using prior map based images from ground penetrating radar. Termed "Localizing Ground Penetrating Radar" (LGPR), centimeter-level accuracies at speeds up to 100 km/h (60 mph) have been demonstrated. Researchers believe this technique may overcome localization challenges in snow, which poses difficulty for commonly used LIDAR-based localization systems. Closed-loop operation was first demonstrated in 2012 for autonomous vehicle steering and fielded for military operation in 2013. Highway speed centimeter-level localization during a night-time snow-storm was demonstrated in 2016.

=== Archaeology ===
Ground penetrating radar survey is one method used in archaeological geophysics. GPR can be used to detect and map subsurface archaeological artifacts, features, and patterning.

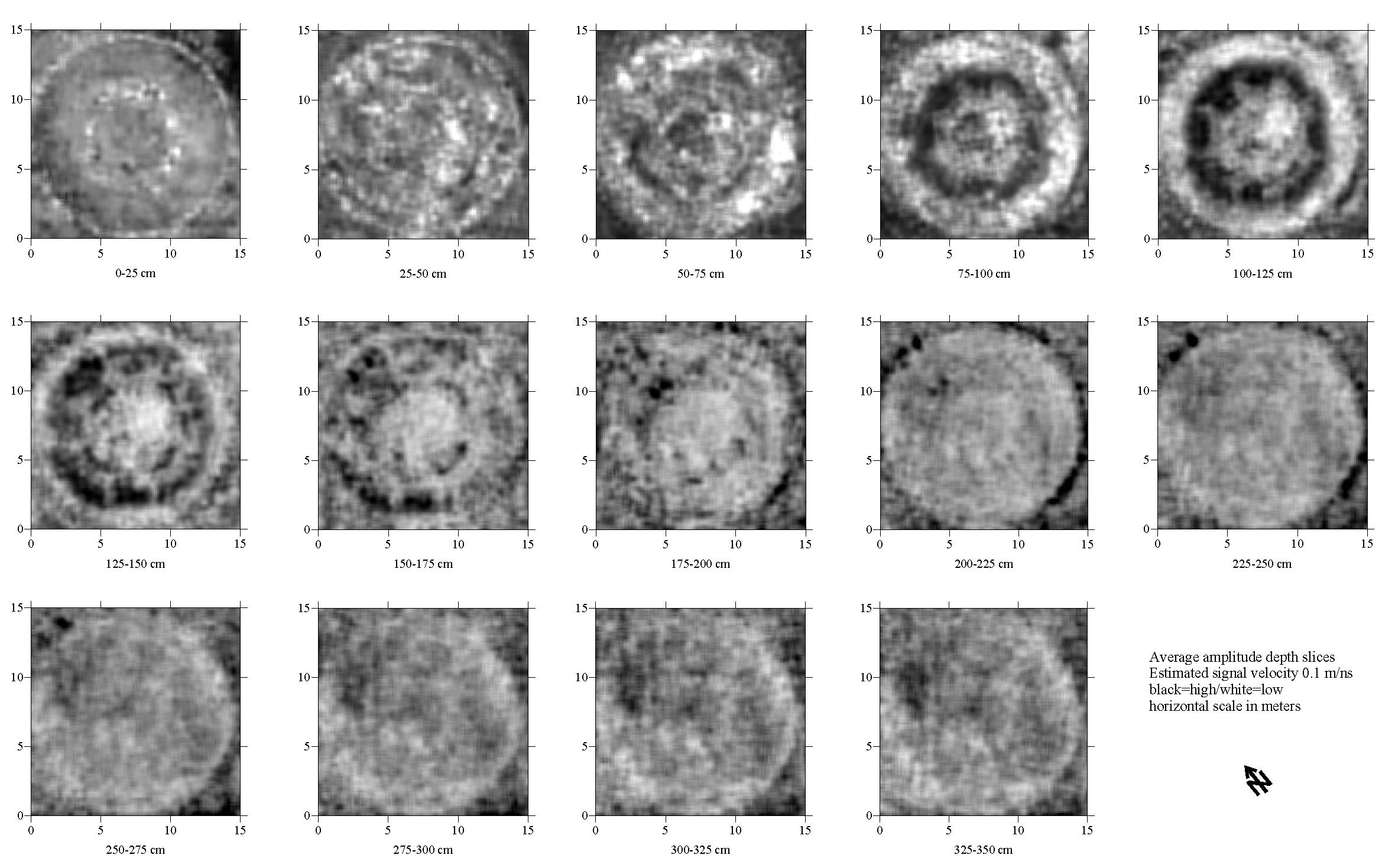
GPR depth slices showing a crypt in a historic cemetery. These planview maps show subsurface structures at different depths. Sixty lines of data – individually representing vertical profiles – were collected and assembled as a 3-dimensional data array that can be horizontally "sliced" at different depths.)

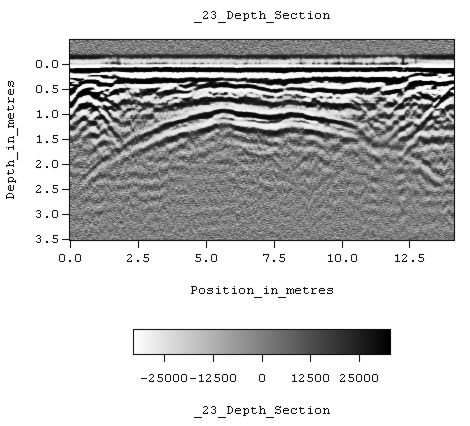
GPR depth section (profile) showing a single line of data from the survey of the historic crypt shown above. The domed roof of the crypt can be seen between 1 and 2.5 meters below surface.

The concept of radar is familiar to most people. With ground penetrating radar, the radar signal – an electromagnetic pulse – is directed into the ground. Subsurface objects and stratigraphy (layering) will cause reflections that are picked up by a receiver. The travel time of the reflected signal indicates the depth. Data may be plotted as profiles, as planview maps isolating specific depths, or as three-dimensional models.

GPR can be a powerful tool in favorable conditions (uniform sandy soils are ideal). Like other geophysical methods used in archaeology (and unlike excavation) it can locate artifacts and map features without any risk of damaging them. Among methods used in archaeological geophysics, it is unique both in its ability to detect some small objects at relatively great depths, and in its ability to distinguish the depth of anomaly sources.

The principal disadvantage of GPR is that it is severely limited by less-than-ideal environmental conditions. Fine-grained sediments (clays and silts) are often problematic because their high electrical conductivity causes loss of signal strength; rocky or heterogeneous sediments scatter the GPR signal, weakening the useful signal while increasing extraneous noise.

In the field of cultural heritage GPR with high frequency antenna is also used for investigating historical masonry structures, detecting cracks and decay patterns of columns and detachment of frescoes.

=== Burial sites ===
GPR is used by criminologists, historians, and archaeologists to search burial sites. In his publication, Interpreting Ground-penetrating Radar for Archaeology, Lawrence Conyers, one of the first archaeological specialists in GPR, described the process. Conyers published research using GPR in El Salvador in 1996, in the Four Corners region Chaco period in southern Arizona in 1997, and in a medieval site in Ireland in 2018. Informed by Conyer's research, the Institute of Prairie and Indigenous Archaeology at the University of Alberta, in collaboration with the National Centre for Truth and Reconciliation, have been using GPR in their survey of Indian Residential Schools in Canada. By June 2021, the Institute had used GPR to locate suspected unmarked graves in areas near historic cemeteries and Indian Residential Schools.

On May 27, 2021, it was reported that 215 unmarked anomalies (possibly children's graves) were found using GPR at a burial site at the Kamloops Indian Residential School on Tk'emlúps te Secwépemc First Nation land in British Columbia. In June 2021, GPR technology was used by the Cowessess First Nation in Saskatchewan to locate 751 unmarked gravesites on the Marieval Indian Residential School site, which had been in operation for a century until it was closed down in 1996.

Advancements in GPR technology integrated with various 3D software modelling platforms generate three-dimensional reconstructions of subsurface "shapes and their spatial relationships". By 2021, this has been "emerging as the new standard".

=== Glaciology ===
Radioglaciology is the study of glaciers, ice sheets, ice caps and icy moons using ice penetrating radar. It employs a geophysical method similar to ground-penetrating radar and typically operates at frequencies in the MF, HF, VHF and UHF portions of the radio spectrum. This technique is also commonly referred to as "Ice Penetrating Radar (IPR)" or "Radio Echo Sounding (RES)".

Glaciers are particularly well suited to investigation by radar because the conductivity, imaginary part of the permittivity, and the dielectric absorption of ice are small at radio frequencies resulting in low loss tangent, skin depth, and attenuation values. This allows echoes from the base of the ice sheet to be detected through ice thicknesses greater than 4 km. The subsurface observation of ice masses using radio waves has been an integral and evolving geophysical technique in glaciology for over half a century. Its most widespread uses have been the measurement of ice thickness, subglacial topography, and ice sheet stratigraphy. It has also been used to observe the subglacial and conditions of ice sheets and glaciers, including hydrology, thermal state, accumulation, flow history, ice fabric, and bed geology. In planetary science, ice penetrating radar has also been used to explore the subsurface of the Polar Ice Caps on Mars and comets. Missions are planned to explore the icy moons of Jupiter.

== Three-dimensional imaging ==
Individual lines of GPR data represent a sectional (profile) view of the subsurface. Multiple lines of data systematically collected over an area may be used to construct three-dimensional or tomographic images. Data may be presented as three-dimensional blocks, or as horizontal or vertical slices. Horizontal slices (known as "depth slices" or "time slices") are essentially planview maps isolating specific depths. Time-slicing has become standard practice in archaeological applications, because horizontal patterning is often the most important indicator of cultural activities.

== Limitations ==
The most significant performance limitation of GPR is in high-conductivity materials such as clay soils and soils that are salt contaminated. Performance is also limited by signal scattering in heterogeneous conditions (e.g. rocky soils).

Other disadvantages of currently available GPR systems include:

- Interpretation of radar-grams is generally non-intuitive to the novice.
- Considerable expertise is necessary to effectively design, conduct, and interpret GPR surveys.
- Relatively high energy consumption can be problematic for extensive field surveys.

Radar is sensitive to changes in material composition; detecting changes requires movement. When looking through stationary items using surface-penetrating or ground-penetrating radar, the equipment needs to be moved in order for the radar to examine the specified area by looking for differences in material composition. While it can identify items such as pipes, voids, and soil, it cannot identify the specific materials, such as gold and precious gems. It can, however, be useful in providing subsurface mapping of potential gem-bearing pockets, or "vugs". The readings can be confused by moisture in the ground and they can't separate gem-bearing pockets from non-gem-bearing ones.

When determining depth capabilities, the frequency range of the antenna dictates the size of the antenna and the depth capability. The grid spacing which is scanned is based on the size of the targets that need to be identified and the results required. Typical grid spacings can be 1 meter, 3 ft, 5 ft, 10 ft, 20 ft for ground surveys, and for walls and floors 1 inch to 1 ft.

The speed at which a radar signal travels is dependent upon the composition of the material being penetrated. The depth to a target is determined based on the amount of time it takes for the radar signal to reflect back to the unit's antenna. Radar signals travel at different velocities through different types of materials. It is possible to use the depth to a known object to determine a specific velocity and then calibrate the depth calculations.

== Power regulation ==
In 2005, the European Telecommunications Standards Institute introduced legislation to regulate GPR equipment and GPR operators to control excess emissions of electromagnetic radiation. The European GPR association (EuroGPR) was formed as a trade association to represent and protect the legitimate use of GPR in Europe.

== Similar technologies ==
=== Enhanced ground imaging and bomb detection ===
Ground-penetrating radar uses a variety of technologies to generate the radar signal: these are impulse, stepped frequency, frequency-modulated continuous-wave (FMCW), and noise. Systems on the market in 2009 also use Digital signal processing (DSP) to process the data during survey work rather than off-line.

A special kind of GPR uses unmodulated continuous-wave signals. This holographic subsurface radar differs from other GPR types in that it records plan-view subsurface holograms. Depth penetration of this kind of radar is rather small (20–30 cm), but lateral resolution is enough to discriminate different types of landmines in the soil, or cavities, defects, bugging devices, or other hidden objects in walls, floors, and structural elements.

GPR is used on vehicles for high-speed road survey and landmine detection. EU Detect Force Technology, an advanced soil research company, design uses X6 Plus Grounding Radar (XGR) as an hybrid GPR application for military mine detection and also police bomb detection. The "Mineseeker Project" seeks to design a system to determine whether landmines are present in areas using ultra wideband synthetic aperture radar units mounted on blimps.

=== Utility lines ===
In Pipe-Penetrating Radar (IPPR) and In Sewer GPR (ISGPR) are applications of GPR technologies applied in non-metallic-pipes where the signals are directed through pipe and conduit walls to detect pipe wall thickness and voids behind the pipe walls.

SewerVUE Technology, an advanced pipe condition assessment company uses Pipe Penetrating Radar (PPR) as an in pipe GPR application to see remaining wall thickness, rebar cover, delamination, and detect the presence of voids developing outside the pipe.

=== Wall-penetrating radar ===
Wall-penetrating radar can read through non-metallic structures as demonstrated for the first time by ASIO and Australian Police in 1984 while surveying an ex Russian Embassy in Canberra. Police showed how to watch people up to two rooms away laterally and through floors vertically, could see metal lumps that might be weapons; GPR can even act as a motion sensor for military guards and police.

== See also ==
- Electrical resistivity tomography
