= Icy moonquakes =

Sudden shaking events that occur on the surfaces of icy moons

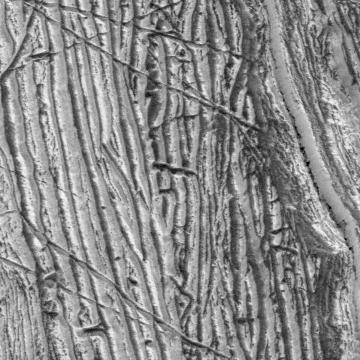
Evidence of icy moonquakes on the surface of Europa

Icy moonquakes are sudden vibrations or shaking events that occur on the surfaces of icy moons, resulting from the abrupt release of energy within their interiors. Although direct seismic measurements from these moons remain elusive, tectonic landforms such as ridges, troughs, bands, and undulations observed on Europa, Ganymede, and Enceladus suggest active tectonism beneath their icy moons. These moons are known to harbor subsurface oceans beneath their icy crusts, which may play a role in driving such processes.

Current understanding of icy moonquakes is primarily based on data from spacecraft missions such as Galileo and Cassini, which have provided high-resolution imagery and stereo-derived topography. These datasets were studied to analyze geological features such as fault scarps, smooth terrains, and landslides—interpreted as the surface expressions of tectonic processes like extensional faulting and mass wasting, potentially triggered by seismic activity.

Unlike earthquakes on Earth that are typically caused by the movement of tectonic plates, icy moonquakes result from geological and tidal force processes. Studying these processes is essential for understanding the internal structures/dynamics and potential habitability of icy moons in the outer solar system.

== Seismic sources on icy moons ==
Tidal interactions are the primary driver of seismic activity on icy moons. The gravitational pull of their host planets induces tidal stresses and heating on these satellites through diurnal cycles and non-synchronous rotation. These stresses manifest as tectonic features such as strike slip faults, normal faults, and scarp faces observed on the surface of Europa, Ganymede, and Enceladus. Seismicity driven by diurnal tides is likely to produce more frequent but low magnitude events, whereas activity linked to non-synchronous rotation may generate less frequent but potentially higher magnitude events, with estimates ranging up to Mw ≈5.3 or ≈6.0 depending on the shear modulus of icy crust.

In addition to tidal forces, several other geological processes are thought to generate moonquakes on icy satellites, including impact events, cryovolcanism, and internal silicate tectonic activity. Although impacts are relatively rare on moons like Europa, they can still produce detectable seismic disturbances. Ganymede, for example, is estimated to experience roughly twice as many impacts as Europa, though these typically occur at lower velocities—about 30% less—potentially reducing their seismic effectiveness. Cryovolcanism is another possible contributor to seismic activity on icy moons. This phenomenon involves fracturing older terrain and extruding water, slushy ice, or warm ductile ice from the subsurface. Cryovolcanic activity is generally classified into effusive and eruptive forms, the latter of which can produce distinct seismic signals during eruptions. Evidence of widespread cryovolcanic resurfacing has been observed on bodies such as Ganymede and Europa. Some icy moons may also harbor geologically active silicate interiors, which can support tectonic processes that generate seismic energy. High-resolution imagery from the Galileo mission suggests that Ganymede's surface has undergone significant modification through tectonic resurfacing, where older features are disrupted or replaced by fault-induced activity—an interpretation that has also been proposed for Enceladus.

== Observed features and evidence ==
=== Europa ===
Europa has a young (<60 Ma), ice-covered surface shaped by a long and complex history of tectonic activity. Its crust is marked by numerous fractures and relatively few large craters, pointing to recent resurfacing. Prominent geological features include ridges, troughs, bands, and surface undulations. Troughs, often V-shaped and curved, are thought to form through tension similar to crevasse on Earth. Ridges—Europa's most common landform—typically appear in double formations flanking a central trough and are believed to result from various extensional forces such as tidal stress or subsurface activity. Bands are another distinct feature, defined by sharp edges and evidence of lateral movement, suggesting significant strike-slip motion. Their structure can often be reconstructed through geometric modeling, highlighting Europa's active and dynamic ice shell.

=== Enceladus ===
The dichotomy of Enceladus' terrain, ancient terrain, approximately 4.2 billion years old, and geologically young regions less than a million years old indicates a wide variety of tectonism. This diversity of terrains makes Enceladus one of the most geologically interesting icy bodies in the solar system. The south-polar region of Enceladus has a series of subparallel troughs flanked by ridges. Informally described as "tiger stripes," these features are likely associated with thermal anomalies and active plumes of water vapor. The region also contains arcuate scarps, while the older north polar cratered terrain remains largely undeformed. The Cassini spacecraft observed active plumes at the south pole of Enceladus, which gave evidence of Enceladus's active tectonism.

=== Ganymede ===
Ganymede's surface features two distinct terrains: dark, ancient regions (33%) with low albedo and heavy cratering and lighter, younger regions (67%) with higher albedo, tectonic activity, and fewer craters. The light terrain forms ridged bands through extensional processes, where a brittle upper layer over a viscous interior undulates, creating parallel ridges and grooves. High-resolution images reveal smooth, textureless areas with faint lineations and striated slopes with fine downslope grooves. These features reflect ongoing tectonic reshaping and surface renewal on Ganymede.

== Future missions and research ==
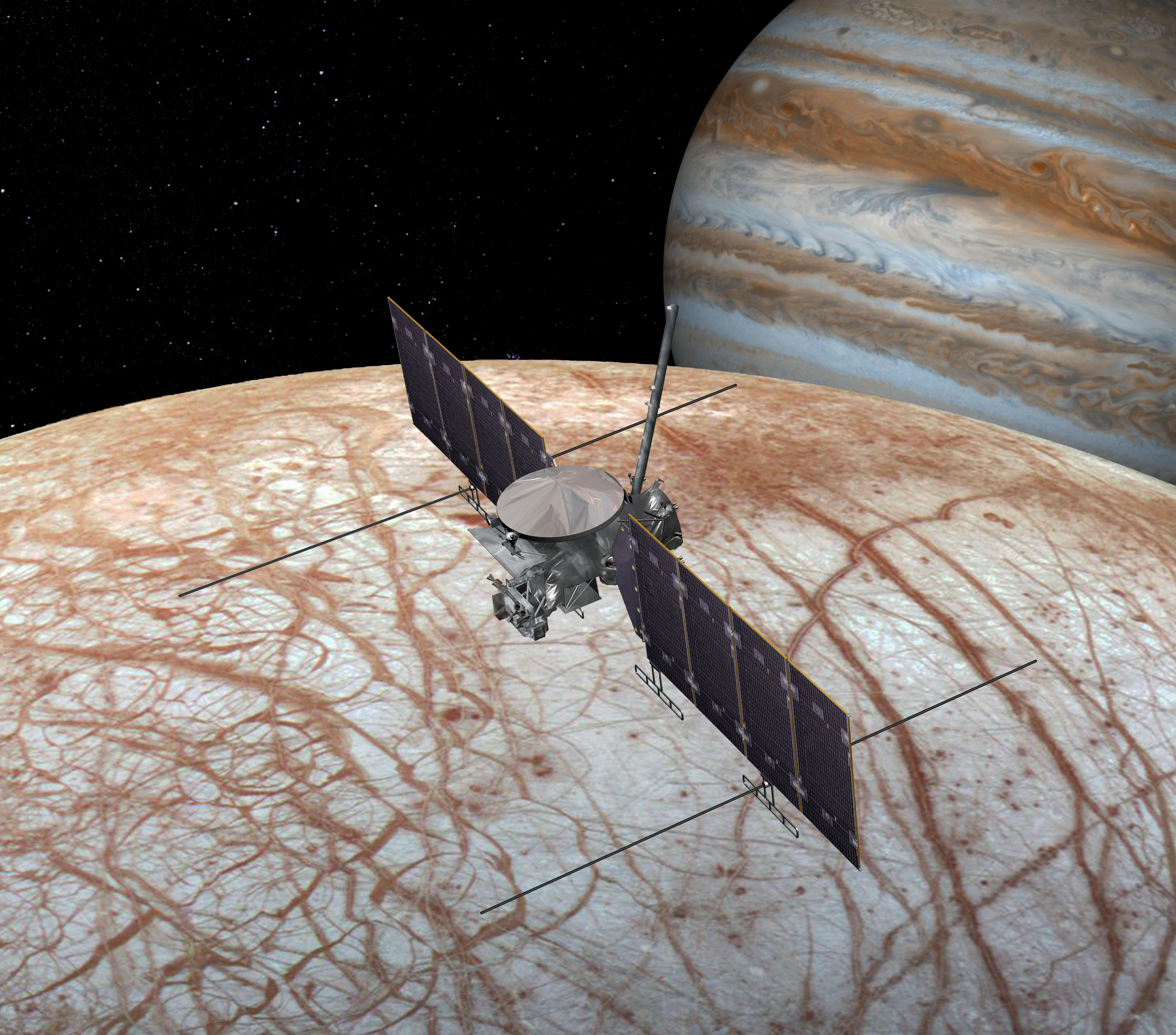
An artist's impression of the NASA's Europa Clipper Spacecraft showing the spacecraft's configuration, which could change before launch, as of early 2016.

NASA and ESA has launched 2 spacecrafts on 14 October named Europa Clipper and Jupiter Icy Moons Explorer (JUICE) to the icy planets around Jupiter to understand potentially friendly worlds for life could form around gas giants.

=== Europa Clipper Mission ===
NASA's Europa Clipper, launched on October 14, 2024, will reach Jupiter's orbit and orbit Jupiter by April 2030 to study Europa's ice shell, subsurface ocean, composition, and geology. During nearly 50 flybys as low as 16 miles (25 km) above the surface, it will scan the entire moon to assess its astrobiological potential and habitability beyond Earth.

=== JUICE (Jupiter Icy Moons Explorer) ===
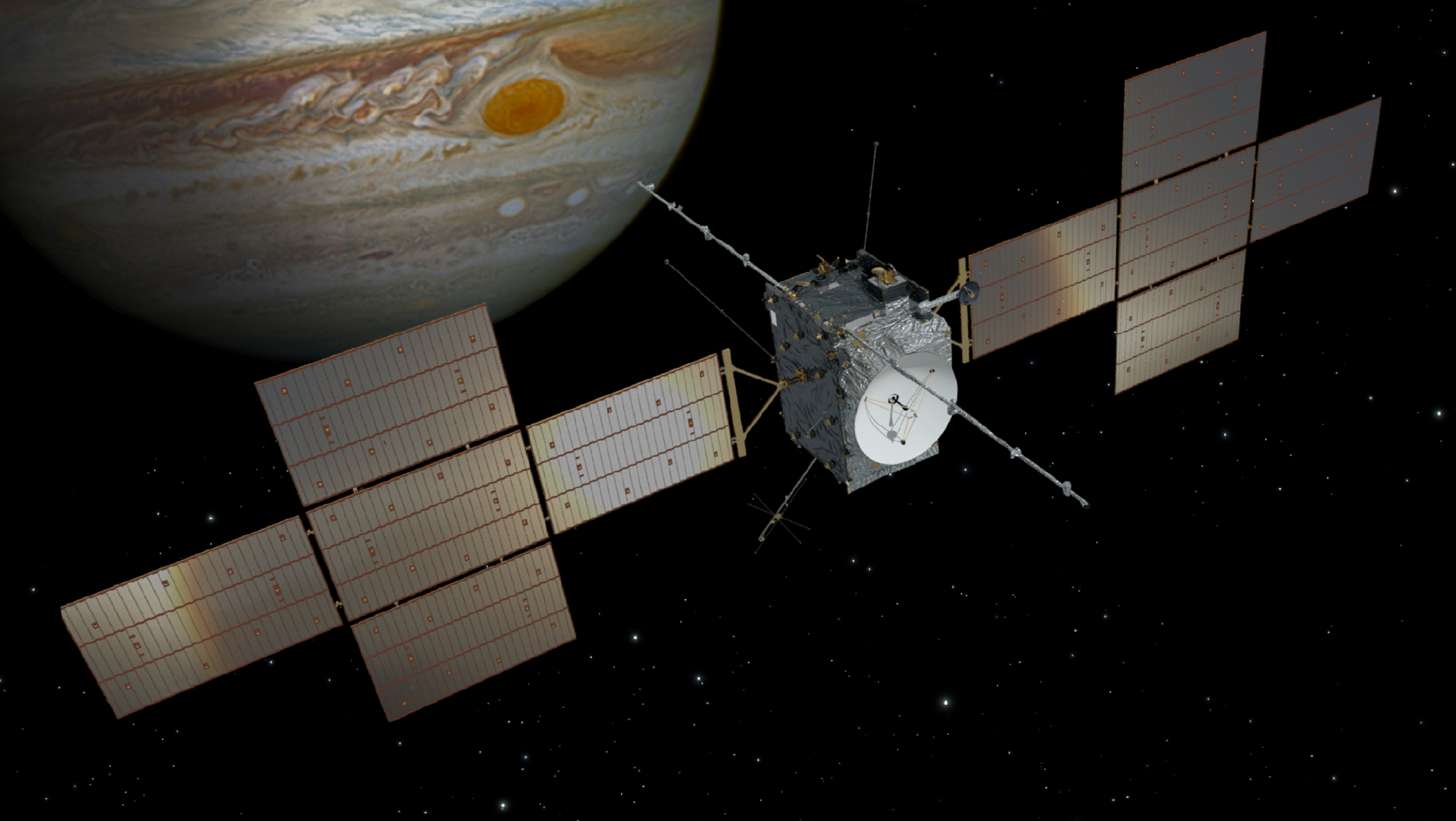
Artist's impression of the Jupiter Icy Moons Explorer spacecraft orbiting Jupiter.

ESA's JUICE mission, launched April 14, 2023, from French Guiana via Ariane 5, will study Jupiter's icy moons (Ganymede, Europa, Callisto) as potential habitats and analyze Jupiter's environment as a model for gas giants. After an eight-year journey with flybys of Venus, Earth, and the Moon, it will enter Jupiter's orbit in July 2031. The spacecraft will conduct science operations six months before orbital insertion, perform multiple moon flybys, and culminate in a dedicated orbital study of Ganymede.

== See also ==
- Tectonics on icy moons
