= Radioglaciology =

Radioglaciology is the study of glaciers, ice sheets, ice caps and icy moons using ice penetrating radar. It employs a geophysical method similar to ground-penetrating radar and typically operates at frequencies in the MF, HF, VHF and UHF portions of the radio spectrum. This technique is also commonly referred to as "Ice Penetrating Radar (IPR)" or "Radio Echo Sounding (RES)".

Glaciers are particularly well suited to investigation by radar because the conductivity, imaginary part of the permittivity, and the dielectric absorption of ice are small at radio frequencies resulting in low loss tangent, skin depth, and attenuation values. This allows echoes from the base of the ice sheet to be detected through ice thicknesses greater than 4 km. The subsurface observation of ice masses using radio waves has been an integral and evolving geophysical technique in glaciology for over half a century. Its most widespread uses have been the measurement of ice thickness, subglacial topography, and ice sheet stratigraphy. It has also been used to observe the subglacial and conditions of ice sheets and glaciers, including hydrology, thermal state, accumulation, flow history, ice fabric, and bed geology. In planetary science, ice penetrating radar has also been used to explore the subsurface of the Polar Ice Caps on Mars and comets. Missions are planned to explore the icy moons of Jupiter.

== Measurements and applications ==
Radioglaciology uses nadir facing radars to probe the subsurface of glaciers, ice sheets, ice caps, and icy moons and to detect reflected and scattered energy from within and beneath the ice. This geometry tends to emphasize coherent and specular reflected energy resulting in distinct forms of the radar equation. Collected radar data typically undergoes signal processing ranging from stacking (or pre-summing) to migration to Synthetic Aperture Radar (SAR) focusing in 1, 2, or 3 dimensions. This data is collected using ice penetrating radar systems which range from commercial (or bespoke) ground penetrating radar (GPR) systems to coherent, chirped airborne sounders to swath-imaging, multi-frequency, or polarimetric implementations of such systems. Additionally, stationary, phase-sensitive, and Frequency Modulated Continuous Wave (FMCW) radars have been used to observe snow, ice shelf melt rates, englacial hydrology, ice sheet structure, and vertical ice flow. Interferometric analysis of airborne systems have also been demonstrated to measure vertical ice flow. Additionally, radioglaciological instruments have been developed to operate on autonomous platforms, on in-situ probes, in low-cost deployments, using Software Defined Radios, and exploiting ambient radio signals for passive sounding.

The most common scientific application for radioglaciological observations is measuring ice thickness and bed topography. This includes interpolated "bed maps", widely used in ice sheet modeling and sea level rise projections, studies exploring specific ice-sheet regions, and observations of glacier beds. The strength and character of radar echoes from the bed of the ice sheet are also used to investigate the reflectivity of the bed, the attenuation of radar in the ice, and the morphology of the bed. In addition bed echoes, radar returns from englacial layers are used in studies of the radio stratigraphy of ice sheets including investigations of ice accumulation, flow, and fabric as well as absence or disturbances of that stratigraphy. Radioglaciology data has also been used extensively to study subglacial lakes and glacial hydrology including englacial water, firn aquifers, and their temporal evolution. Ice penetrating radar data has also been used to investigate the subsurface of ice shelves including their grounding zones, melt rates, brine distribution, and basal channels.

== Planetary exploration ==
There are currently two ice-penetrating radars orbiting Mars: MARSIS and SHARAD. An ice penetrating radar was also part of the ROSETTA mission to comet 67P/Churyumov–Gerasimenko. Ice penetrating radars are also included in the payloads of two planned missions to the icy moons of Jupiter: JUICE and Europa Clipper.

== IGS symposia ==
The International Glaciological Society (IGS) holds a periodic series of symposia focused on radioglaciology. In 2008, the "Symposium on Radioglaciology and its Applications" was hosted at the Technical University of Madrid. In 2013, the "Symposium on Radioglaciology" was hosted at the University of Kansas. In 2019, the "Symposium of Five Decades of Radioglaciology" was hosted at Stanford University.

== Research institutions ==
Research and education in radioglaciology is undertaken at universities and research institutes around the world. These groups found in institutions and departments that span physical geography, geophysics, earth science, planetary science, electrical engineering, and related disciplines.
