= ALSE =

Experiment undertaken on the Apollo 17 mission

The ALSE (Apollo Lunar Sounder Experiment) (also known as Scientific Experiment S-209, according to NASA designations) was a ground-penetrating radar (subsurface sounder) experiment that flew on the Apollo 17 mission.

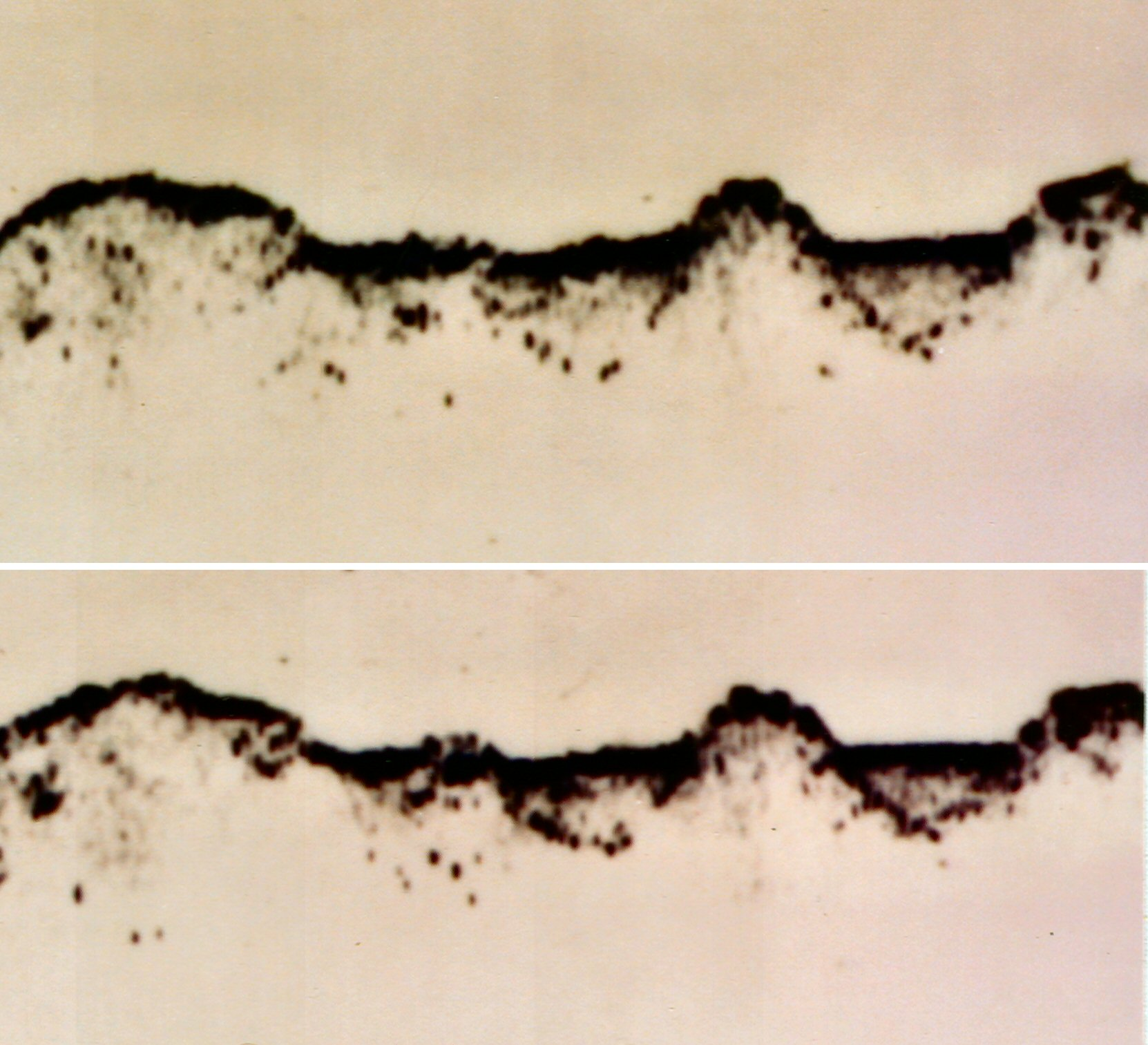
ALSE image of Aitken Basin (16.8ºS, 173.4ºE)

== Mission and science ==
This experiment used radar to study the Moon's surface and interior. Radar waves with wavelengths between 2 and 60 meters (frequencies of 5, 15, and 150 MHz) were transmitted through a series of antennas near the back of the Apollo Service Module. After the waves were reflected by the Moon, they were received using the same antennas and the data was recorded on film for analysis on Earth. The primary purpose of this experiment was to "see" into the upper 2 kilometers of the Moon's crust in a manner somewhat analogous to using seismic waves to study the internal structure of the Moon. This was possible because very long radar wavelengths were used and because the Moon is very dry, which allowed the radar waves to penetrate much deeper into the Moon than would have been possible if water were present in lunar rocks. (A radar experiment on the Space Shuttle has been similarly used to map ancient river valleys beneath the Sahara Desert.) This experiment also provided very precise information about the Moon's topography. In addition to studying the Moon, the experiment also measured radio emissions from the Milky Way galaxy.

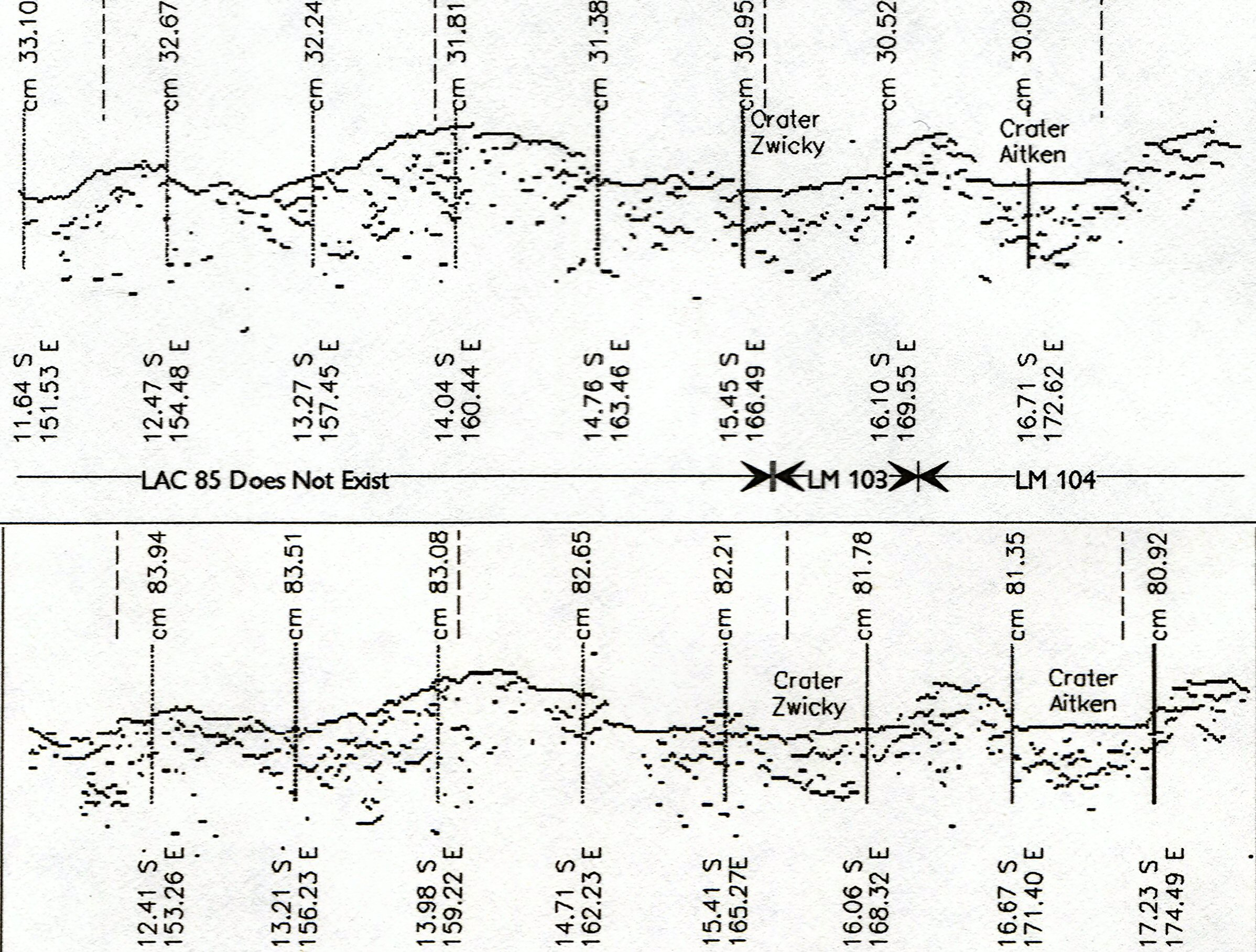
Processed ALSE data from Aiken Basin

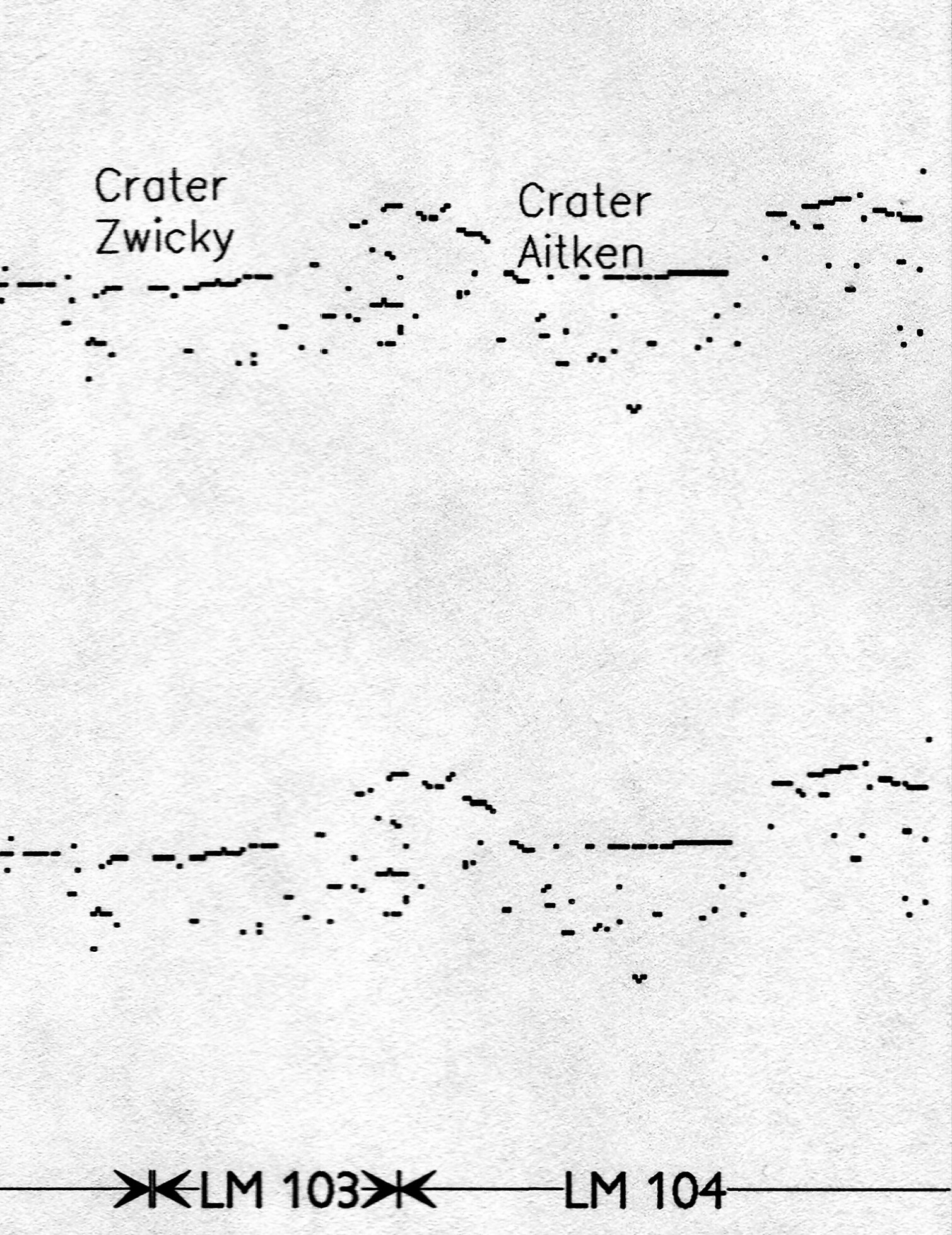
Cross-correlated ALSE data from Aiken Basin

This experiment revealed structures beneath the surface in Mare Crisium, Mare Serenitatis, Oceanus Procellarum, and many other areas. In the mare areas, layers were observed in several different parts of the basins and are therefore believed to be widespread features. Based on the properties of the reflected radar waves, the structures are believed to be layering within the basalt that fills both of these mare basins. In Mare Serenitatis, layers were detected at depths of 0.9 and 1.6 kilometers below the surface. In Mare Crisium, a layer was detected at a depth of 1.4 kilometers below the surface. The bottom of the mare basalts were apparently not detected by this experiment. However, in Mare Crisium the Lunar Sounder Experiment results were combined with other observations to estimate a total basalt thickness of between 2.4 and 3.4 kilometers.

The Lunar Sounder Experiment also contributed to our understanding of wrinkle ridges on the Moon. These long, low ridges are found in many of the lunar maria. Most lunar geologists believe that these ridges formed when the Moon's surface was deformed by motion along faults ("moonquakes") in the Moon's crust more than 3 billion years ago. The weight of several kilometers of mare basalt in these areas caused the Moon's surface to sag somewhat, and this motion caused the surface to buckle in some places, forming the wrinkle ridges. However, other scientists suggested that these ridges are volcanic features, formed by the flow of magma either on the Moon's surface or within the crust. The Lunar Sounder Experiment studied several wrinkle ridges in southern Mare Serenitatis in detail, providing information about both the topography of these ridges and about structures in the crust below these ridges. These results support the idea that wrinkle ridges formed primarily by motions along faults.

== Instrument design ==
The ALSE instrument operated in two HF bands (5 MHz: HF1 and 15 MHz: HF2) center frequencies and one VHF band (150 MHz), each with a bandwidth of 10% (using a chirped signal). The two HF bands shared the same center-feed dipole antenna, while a 7-element Yagi antenna was used for the VHF channel. Two different transceiver were used for the HF (alternating operation between HF1 and HF2 on a PRF-by-PRF basis) and VHF, sharing a common optical recorder. It was not possible to operate in VHF and HF simultaneously. The whole system weighed 43 kg and required 103 W of power. The electronics was located inside the Apollo Service Module. The two halves of the dipole antenna were retractable, on the two sides of the service module itself, while the Yagi used for VHF was stowed close to the main engine and then deployed into position after launch.

Being the primary objective of the experiment the mapping of subsurface layers, the most critical trade-off in the design was that of penetration depth vs resolution: lower frequencies penetrates more, but allowed a smaller signal bandwidth and, therefore, a worst resolution which, in turn, affected the capability to discriminate subsurface echoes close to the surface. The sounding capability was also affected by:

- the range sidelobes of the compressed chirp: they can mask weak subsurface echoes if not properly controlled. ALSE was designed to have a minimum peak-to-sidelobes ratio of 45 dB after the 3rd lobe.
- the surface off-nadir clutter return, which can be confused with the subsurface echo with the same delay. To reduce the along-track clutter, a synthetic aperture is generated in the ground processing, thus narrowing the effective antenna footprint.

Clutter from across-track scatterers had instead to be inferred from the knowledge of the surface topography.

An automatic gain control (AGC) feature was included in all the channels to optimize the signal allocation within the receiver dynamic range. The AGC update rate was 30 s. In both the HF and VHF transceivers, the chirp signal was generated by a swept oscillator synchronized with a STAble Local Oscillator (STALO) in order to preserve the phase coherency for the SAR processing. The received signal was converted at IF and the signal amplitude was used to amplitude-modulate a CRT (swept at PRF rate), in turn impressing a 70 mm film for optical recording of the data. Due to the high recording speed required for the wider bandwidth VHF channel, to minimize the amount of recorded data, this channel used an echo tracking system to acquire and record only the main surface return and the 70 μs of echoes immediately following it. Additionally, on this channel, the receiver gain was increased 13 μs after the arrival of the main surface echo to best exploit the dynamic range on weak subsurface returns.

Since the recorder was located in the service module, astronaut Ron Evans performed an Extra-Vehicular Activity (EVA) during the return flight from the Moon to collect the recorded films.

The processing facility on ground allowed for both full optical processing (at that time, the standard approach for SAR processing) performing azimuth and/or range compression, or digitization of rough or azimuth-compressed data for later digital processing.

During the developments phase, a modified ALSE prototype was installed on board a KC-135 aircraft to perform sounding tests over the southeast US and over Greenland, demonstrating the capabilities of the system.

The main parameters of the ALSE radar are summarized in the table below:

Property	HF1	HF2	VHF
Frequency (MHz)	5.266	15.8	158
Estimated depth of penetration (m)	1300	800	160
Chirp bandwidth (MHz)	0.5333	1.6	16.0
Pulse width (μs)	240	80	8.0
Time (bandwidth product)	128	128	128
Range resolution, free space (m)	300	100	10
Transmitter peak power (W)	130	118	95
Antenna effective Gain (dB one-way)	–0.8	–0.7	+7.3
Noise Figure (dB)	11.4	11.4	10.0
Pulse Repetition Frequency (Hz)	397	397	1984
Acquisition window length (μs)	600	600	70
AGC Gain Range (dB)	12.1	12.1	13.9
Echo tracker	No	No	Yes
