= TOI-1452 b =

Super-Earth orbiting TOI-1452

Discovery
- Discovered by: Cadieux, Charles et al.; International Team
- Discovery site: Université de Montréal
- Discovery date: 2022

Orbital characteristics
- Semi-major axis: 0.061±0.003 AU
- Eccentricity: 0
- Orbital period (sidereal): 11 days
- Inclination: 89.77°±0.16°
- Argument of perihelion: 90
- Star: TOI-1452

Physical characteristics
- Mean radius: 1.672±0.07 R_{🜨}
- Mass: 4.82±1.3 M_{🜨}
- Mean density: 5.6+1.8 −1.6 g/cm^{3}
- Temperature: 326±7 K (53±7 °C)

TOI-1452 b is a confirmed super-Earth exoplanet, possibly a water world, orbiting a red dwarf star TOI-1452 about 100 light-years away in the constellation Draco. The exoplanet is about 70% larger in diameter than Earth, and roughly five times as massive.

== System ==
The TOI-1452 star system is a binary pair of dim red dwarf stars located 99 light-years away from Earth, in the constellation of Draco. The two stars, TOI-1452 and TOI-1760, are separated by only 96 astronomical units (AU). Both stars were listed as priorities on the cool dwarf list, a list of targets for observation by the Transiting Exoplanet Survey Satellite (TESS). TOI-1452 is a flare star, with a flare observed by TESS where the star brightened by 5%.

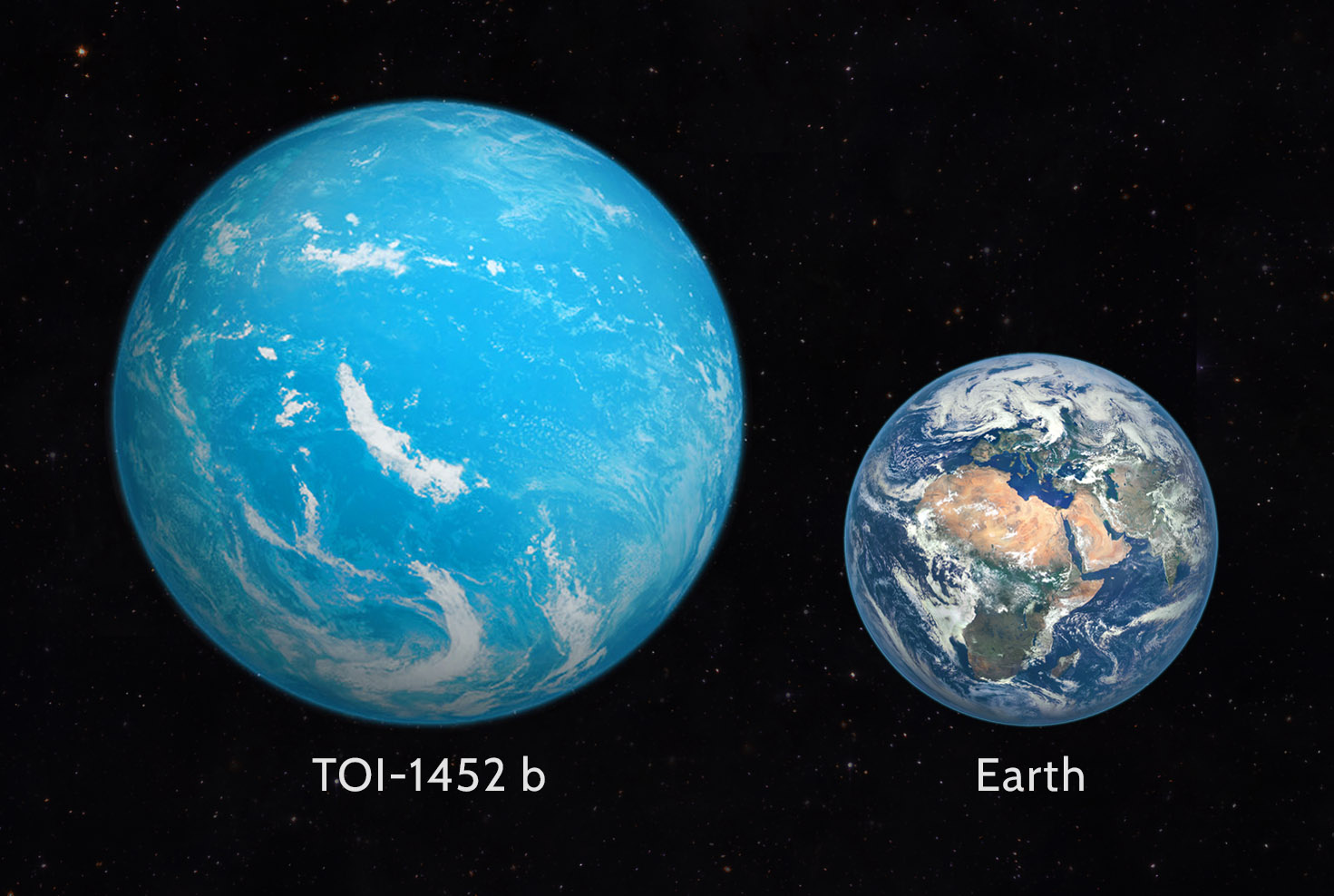
Artist's impression and size comparison of TOI-1452b and Earth

== Discovery ==
TOI-1452 b was discovered by an international team led by astronomers from the Université de Montréal, using data from NASA’s Transiting Exoplanet Survey Satellite (TESS). The discovery was first reported in June 2022.
