= Thalassogen =

Substance capable of forming a planetary ocean

In astronomy, a thalassogen denotes a substance capable of forming a planetary ocean. Thalassogens are not necessarily life sustaining, although most interest has been in the context of extraterrestrial life.

The term was coined by Isaac Asimov in his essay "The Thalassogens", later published in his 1972 collection The Left Hand of the Electron. Said term was coined via the Ancient Greek prefix thalasso- ("sea") and the suffix -gen ("producer").

Elements making up thalassogens have to be relatively abundant, the substance must be chemically stable in its environment, and must remain liquid under the conditions found on some planets. Freitas gives the following table, noting that the liquid range typically increases with increasing pressure:

Possible thalassogen	Melting point (K)	Boiling point (K)	Liquidity range (K)	Critical temperature (K)	Critical pressure (atm)
Helium	0.95 (at 26 atm)	4.55	3.6	5.3	2.26
Hydrogen	14.0	20.6	6.6	33.2	12.8
Neon	24.5	27.2	2.7	44.4	26.9
Oxygen	54.8	90.2	35.4	154.7	50.1
Nitrogen	63.3	77.4	14.1	126	33.5
Carbon monoxide	68.2	83.2	15.0	133.6	35.5
Methane	90.7	111.7	21.0	191	45.8
Carbon disulfide	162.4	319.5	157.1	546.2	78
Hydrogen sulfide	187.7	212.5	24.8	373.5	89
Ammonia	195.4	239.8	44.4	405.5	112.5
Sulfur dioxide	200.5	263.2	62.7	430.3	77.7
Carbon dioxide	216.6 (at 5.2 atm)	304.3 (at 72.8 atm)	(< 87.7)	304.3	72.8
Cyanogen	245.2	252.2	7.0	399.7	
Hydrogen cyanide	259.8	298.8	39.0	456.6	48.9
Nitrogen dioxide	262.0	294.4	32.4	430.9	100
Water	273.1	373.1	100.0	647.2	217.7
Sulfur	386.0	717.8	331.8	1311	116

The critical temperature and pressure represents the point where the distinction between gas and liquid vanishes, a possible upper limit for life (though life in supercritical fluids has been discussed both in science and fiction, such as in Close to Critical by Hal Clement).

Later authors have also suggested sulfuric acid, ethane, and water/ammonia mixtures as possible thalassogens. The discovery of possible subsurface oceans on moons such as Europa (and, less obviously, Ganymede and Callisto) also extends the range of possible environments.

== See also ==
- Extraterrestrial liquid water
- Hypothetical types of biochemistry
