= Icy moon =

Natural satellite with a surface mainly composed of ice

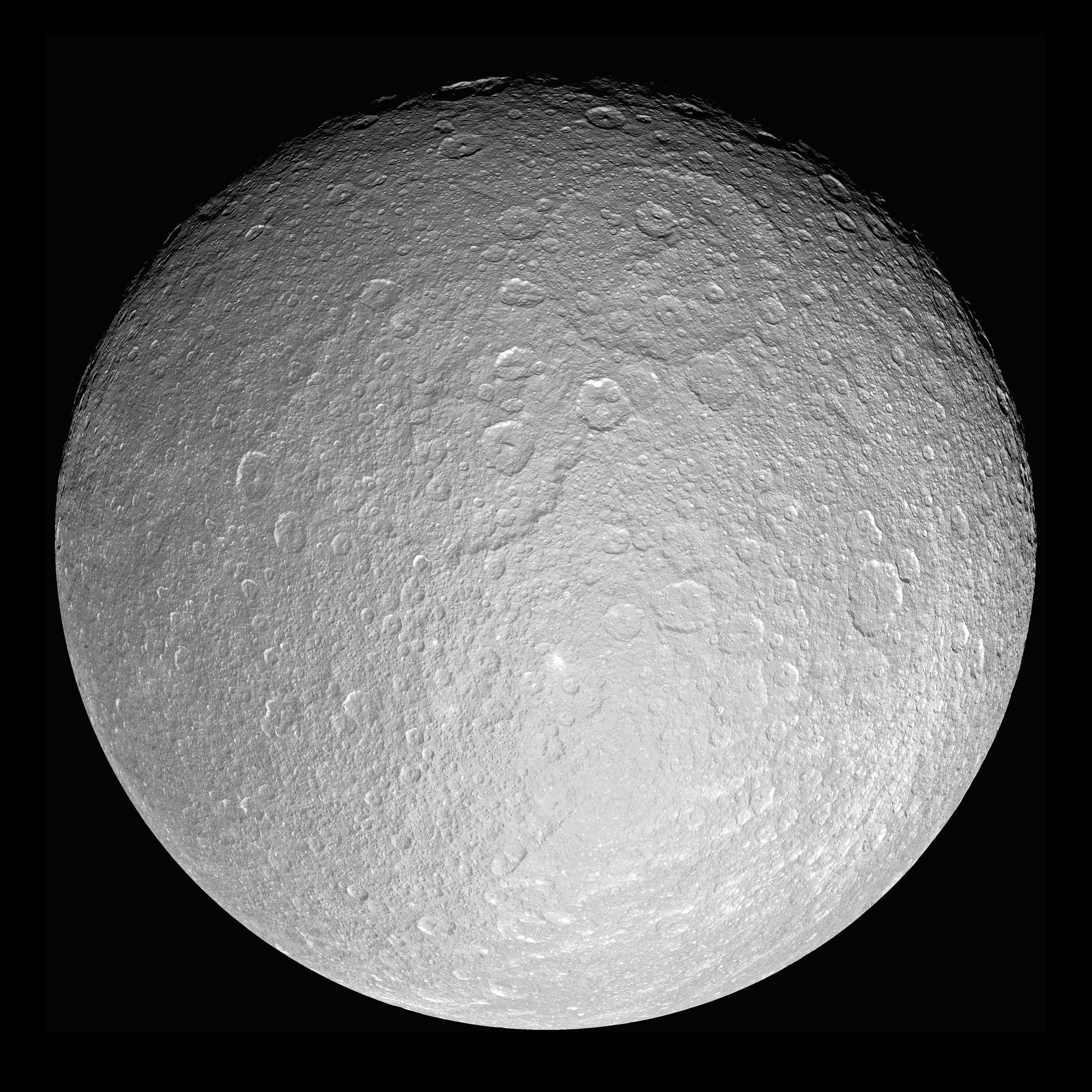
Rhea, the second-largest moon of Saturn and the ninth-largest in the Solar System, is around 3/4 ice by mass.

Icy moons are a class of natural satellites with surfaces composed mostly of ice. An icy moon may harbor an ocean underneath the surface, and possibly include a rocky core of silicate or metallic rocks. It is thought that they may be composed of ice II or other polymorph of water ice. The prime example of this class of object is Europa.

Icy moons warmed by tides may be the most common type of celestial body in the galaxy to have liquid water, and thus the most likely type of object to possibly have water-based life.

Some icy moons exhibit cryovolcanism, as well as geysers. The best studied example is Saturn's Enceladus.

== Orbits ==
Most known large icy moons belong to giant planets, whose orbits lie beyond the Solar System's frost line; the remainder (such as Charon and Dysnomia) formed around dwarf planets such as Pluto and Eris, typically in large impacts not unlike the impact thought to have formed Earth's moon. In the case of icy gas giant satellites, an additional requirement is that a moon did not form in the inner region of a proto-satellite disk, which is too warm for ices to condense.

Europa is thought to contain 8% ice and water by mass with the remainder rock. Jupiter's outer two Galilean moons Ganymede and Callisto contain more ice since they formed further from the hot proto-Jupiter.

Saturn's moon Titan looks and behaves more like Earth than any other body in the Solar System. Titan is known to have stable pools of liquid methane on the surface.

== Images ==
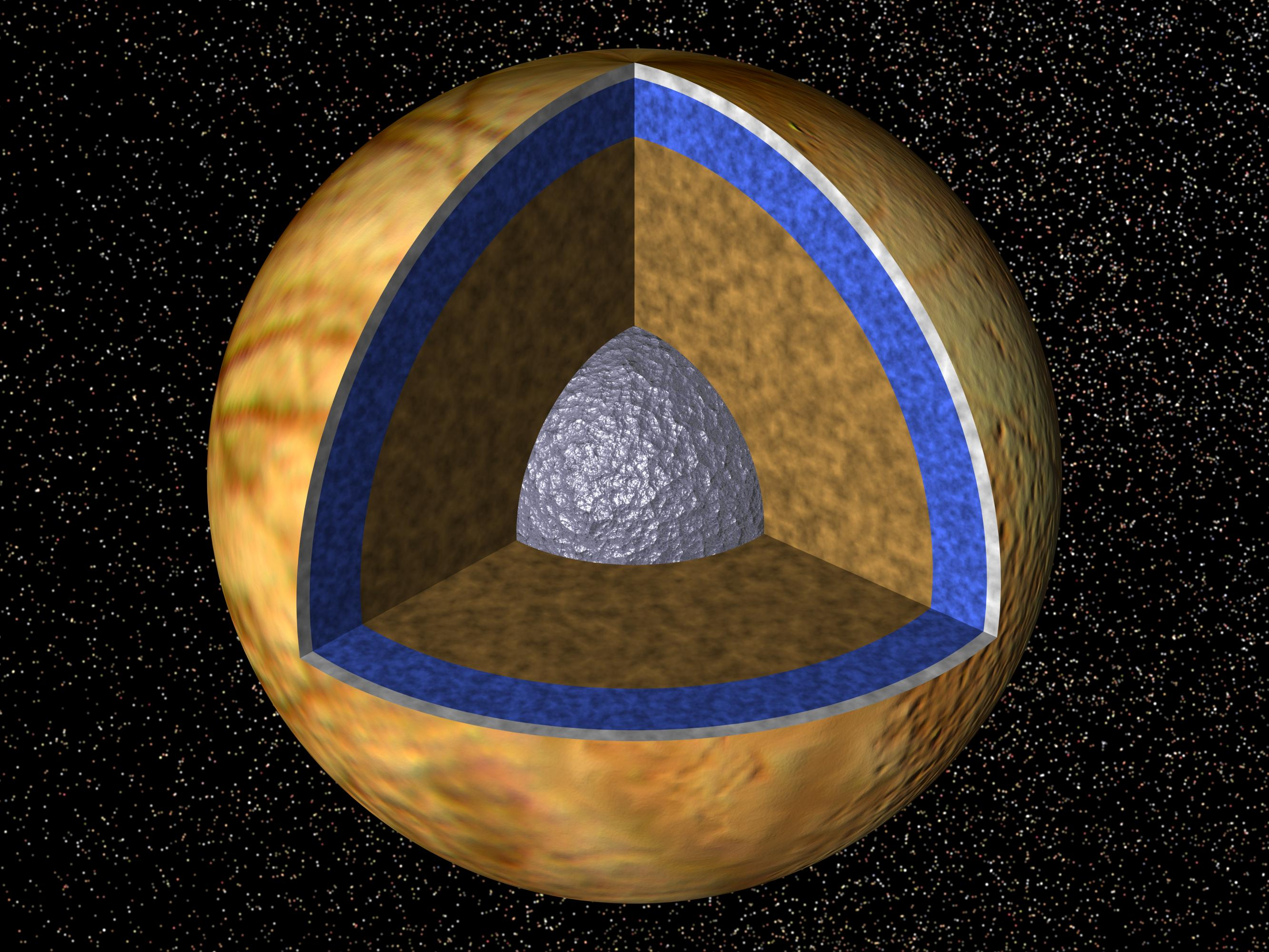
Europa is thought to have a subsurface ocean.

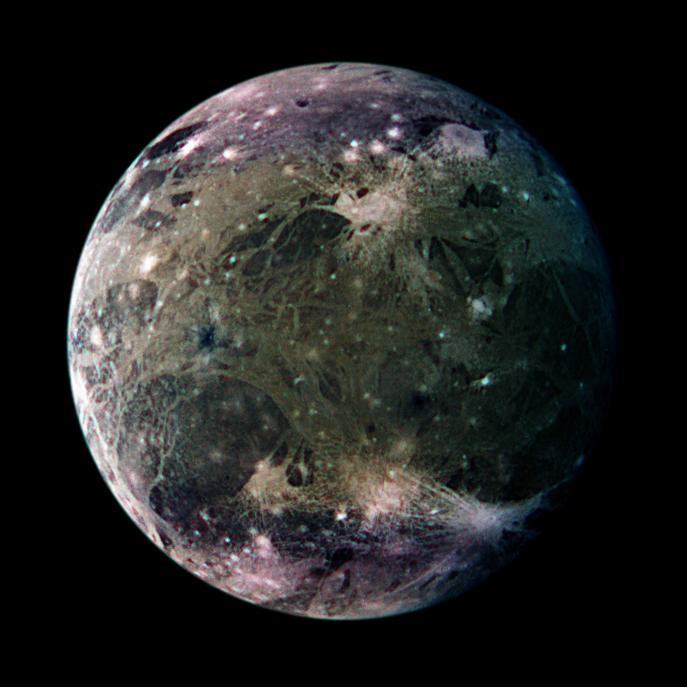
False-color image of Ganymede

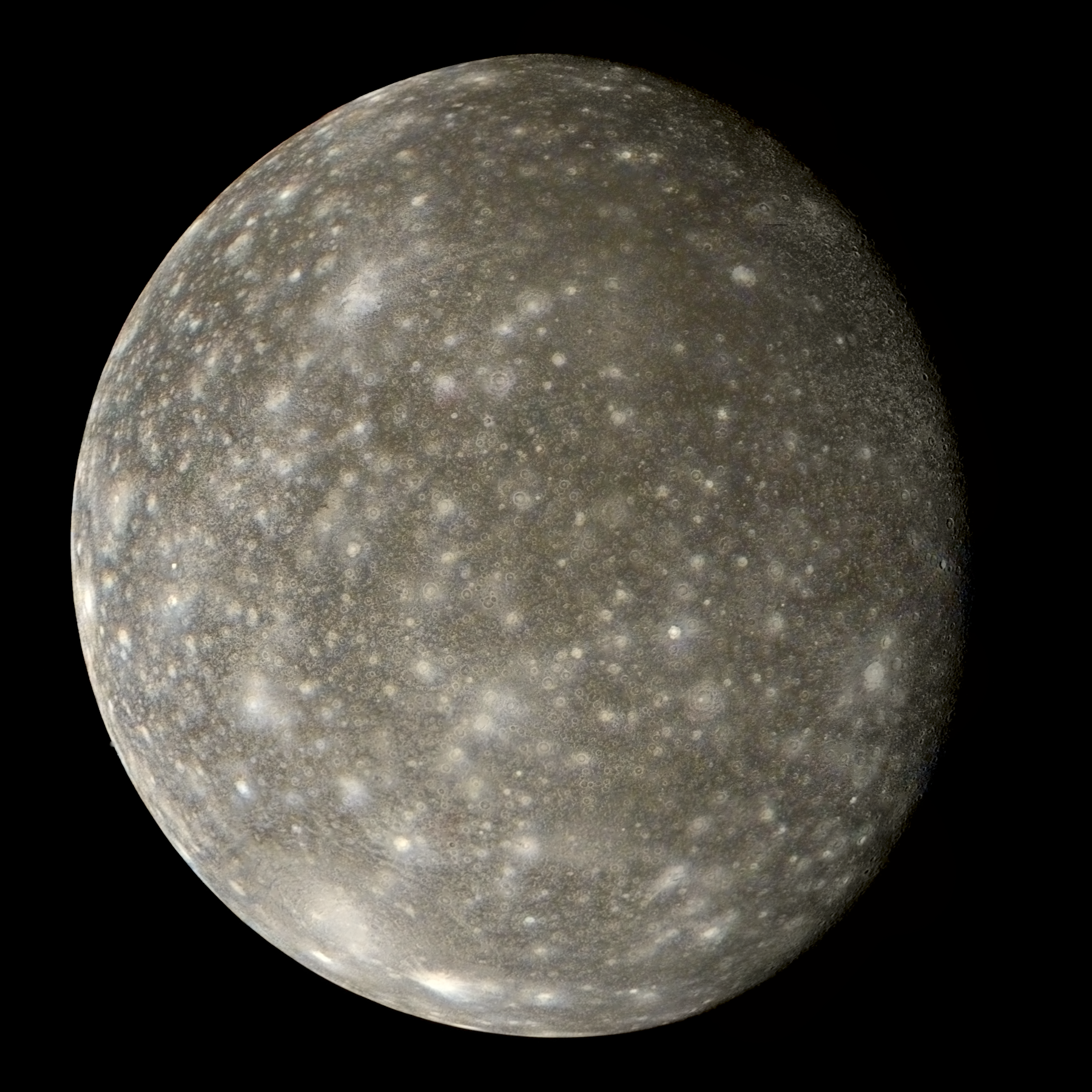
Callisto showing frost deposits

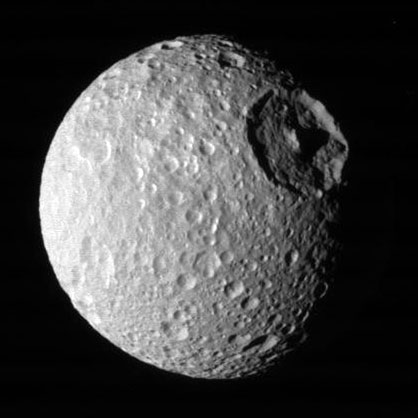
Mimas has a density of 1.1 g/cm^{3}.

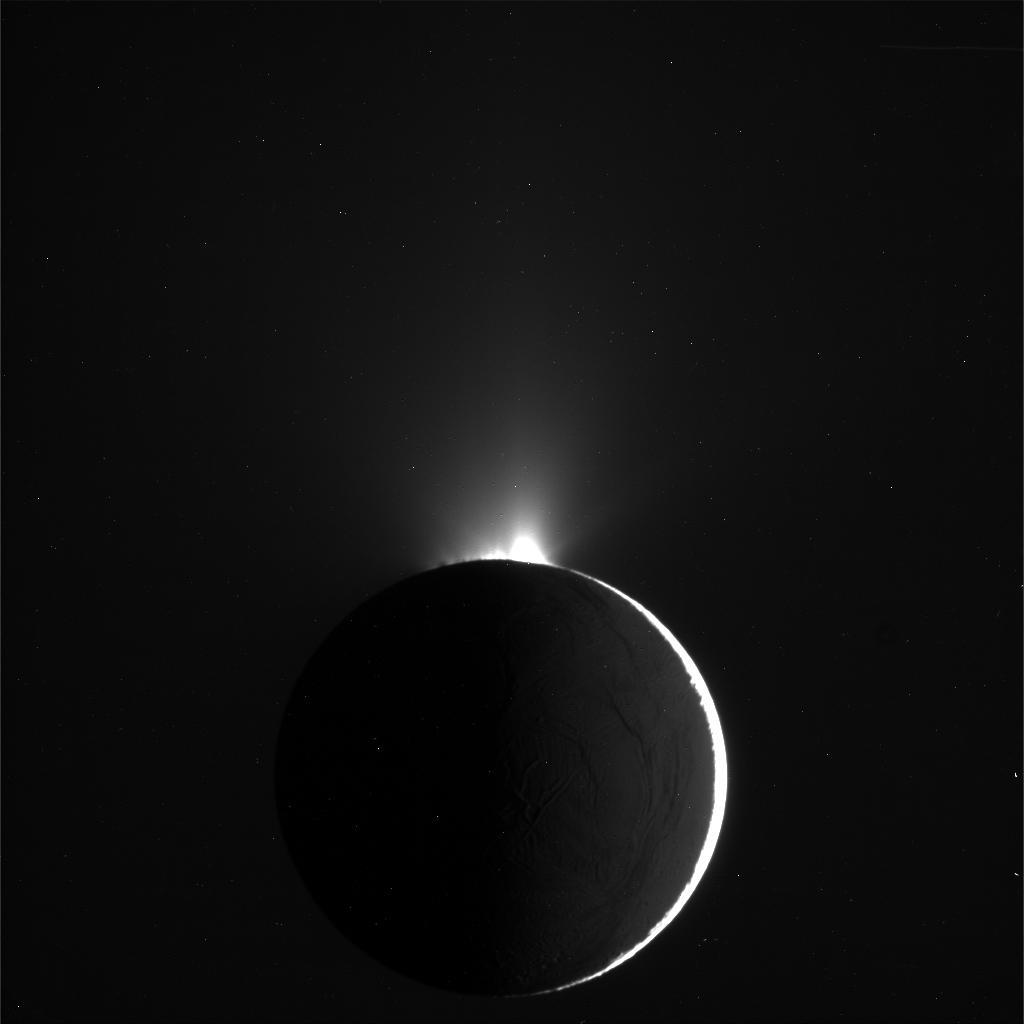
Active plumes on Enceladus

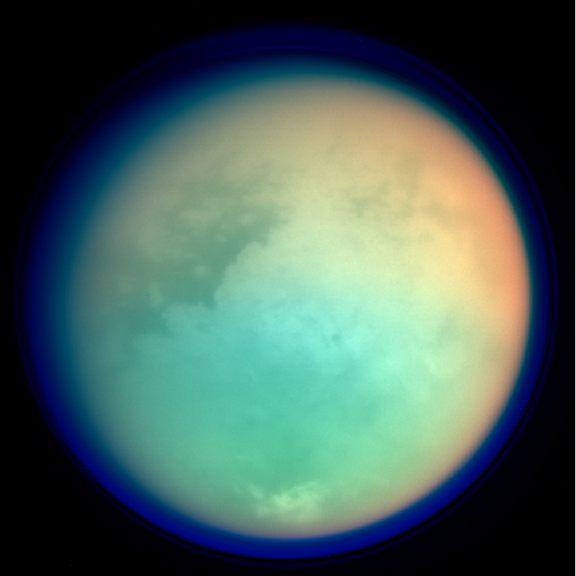
False-color image of Titan showing surface and atmospheric details

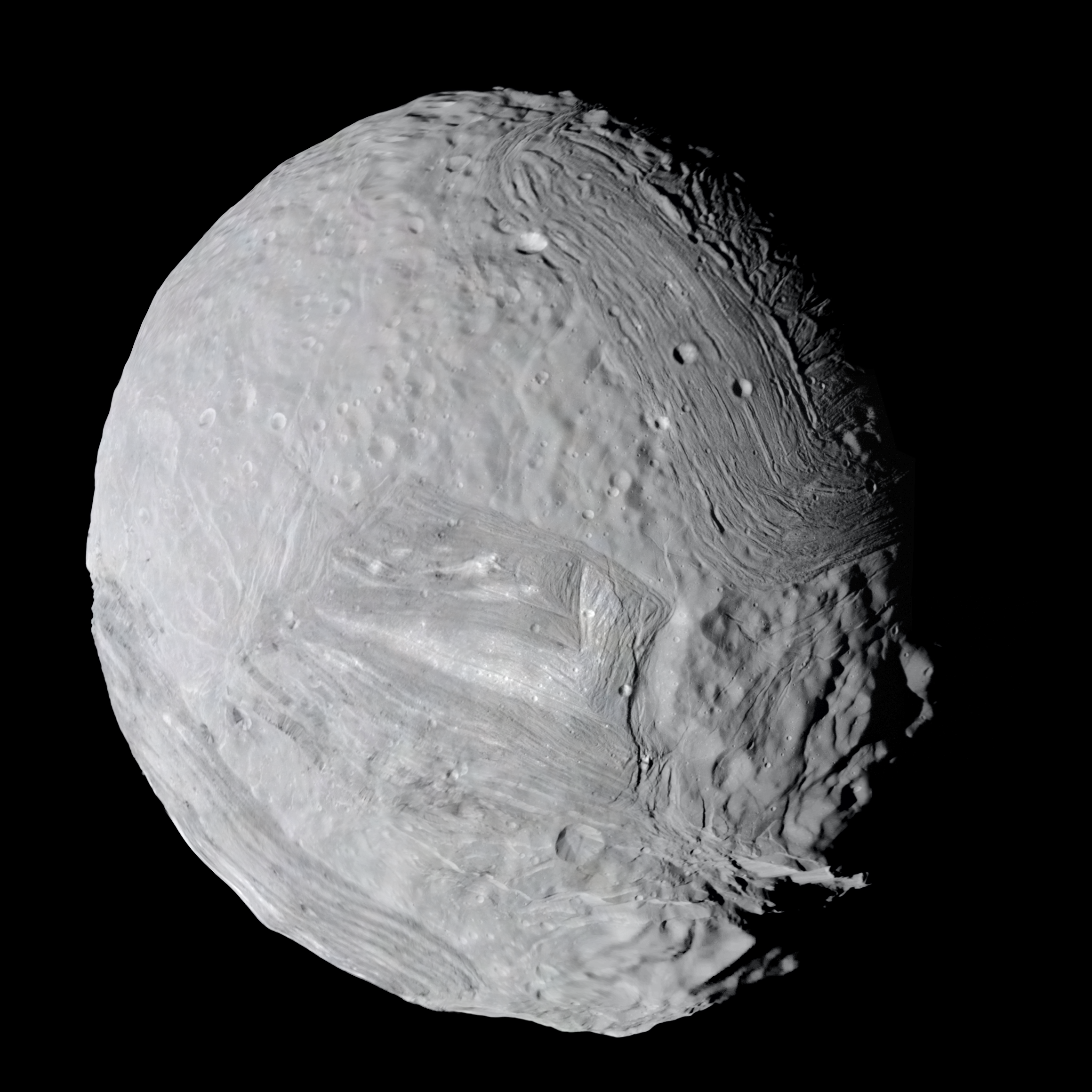
Miranda has a scarred surface.

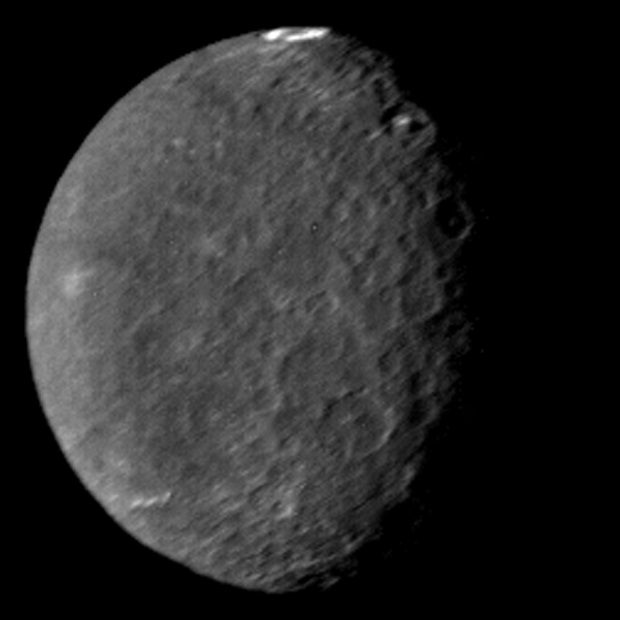
A potential frost deposit on Umbriel's pole

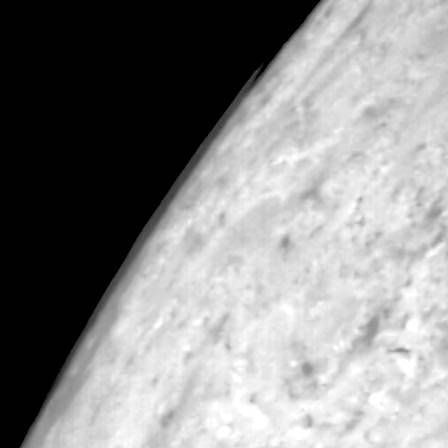
A cloud over the limb of Triton

== See also ==
- Ocean planet
- Ice planet
- Tectonics on icy moons
