= Habitable zone for complex life =

Concept in astrophysics

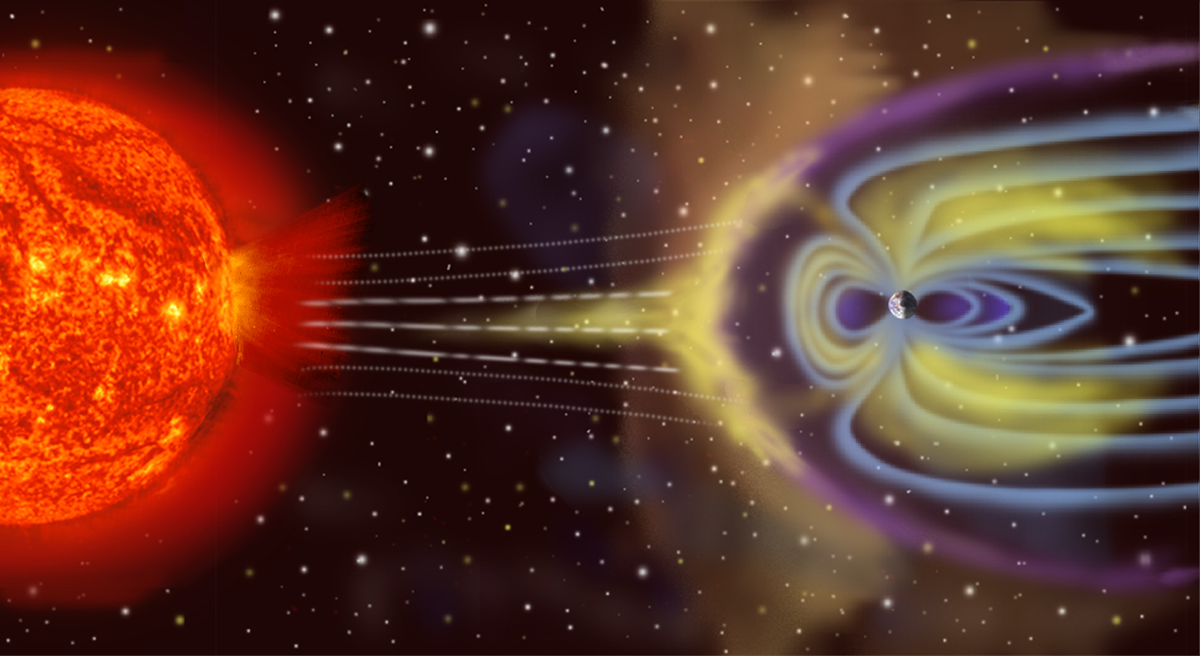
Natural shielding against space weather and solar wind, such as the magnetosphere depicted in this artistic rendition, is required for planets to sustain life for prolonged periods.

A Habitable Zone for Complex Life (HZCL) is a range of distances from a star suitable for complex aerobic life. Conventional habitable zones are based on compatibility with water required for bacterial life. Aerobic organism have additional requirements. Different types of limitations preventing complex life give rise to different zones. A planet would need to orbit inside the boundaries of this zone. With multiple zonal constraints, the zones would need to overlap for the planet to support complex life.

== Exoplanets ==
The first confirmed exoplanets were discovered in 1992, orbiting the pulsar PSR B1257+12. Several hundred candidate exoplanets have been identified within convention habitable zones. Most exoplanets are hot Jupiter planets, that orbit very close the star. Many exoplanets are super-Earths, that could be a gas dwarf or large rocky planet, like Kepler-442b at a mass 2.36 times Earths.

== Star ==
Unstable stars are young or old stars, or very large or small stars. Since they are unstable, they have varying solar luminosity, which changes the size of the life habitable zones. These stars also produce extreme solar flares and coronal mass ejections. Thus, life habitable zones require a very stable star like the Sun, at ±0.1% solar luminosity change. Finding a stable star, like the Sun, is the search for a solar twin, with solar analogs that have been found. Star metallicity, mass, age, color, and temperature all effect luminosity variations. The Sun, a G2V star, has a mid-range metallicity optimal for the formation of rocky planets. Dwarf stars (red dwarf/orange dwarf/brown dwarf/subdwarf) are not only unstable, but also emit low energy, so the habitable zone is very close to the star and planets become tidally locked on the timescales needed for the development of life. Giant stars (subgiant/giant star/red giant/red supergiant) are unstable and emit high energy, so the habitable zone is very far from the star. Multiple-star systems are also very common and are not suitable for complex life, as the planet orbit would be unstable due to multiple gravitational forces and solar radiation. Liquid water is possible in Multiple-star systems.

== Named habitable zones ==
A conventional habitable zone is defined by liquid water.

- Habitable zone (HZ) (also called the circumstellar habitable zone), the orbit around a star that would allow liquid water to remain for a short period of time (a given period of time) on at least a small part of the planet's surface. Thus within the HZ, water, (H_{2}O) is between 0 °C (32 °F; 273 K) and 100 °C (212 °F; 373 K) temperature. This zone is a temperature zone, set by the star's radiation and distance from the star. In the Solar System the planet Mars is just at the outer boundary of the habitable zone. The planet Venus is at the inner edge of the habitable zone, but due to its thick atmosphere it has no water. The HZ includes planets with elliptic orbits; such planets might orbit into and out of the HZ. When a planet moves out of the HZ, all its water would freeze to ice on the outside of the HZ, and/or all water would become steam on the inner side. The HZ could be defined as the region where bacteria, a form of life, could possibly survive for a short period of time. The HZ is also sometimes called the "Goldilocks" zone.
- Continuously habitable zone (CHZ): a zone where liquid water can exist of the entire lifetime of a star. Another variation, CHZ_{2}, is a zone where liquid water would be available for 2 Gyr.
- Conservative habitable zone: a zone where liquid surface water remains on a planet over a long time span, as on Earth. This might also need a greenhouse effect provided by gases such as CO_{2} and water vapor to maintain the correct temperature. Rayleigh scattering would also be needed.
- Optimistic habitable zone (OHZ): a zone where liquid surface water could have been on a planet at some time in its past history. This zone would be larger than the conservative habitable zone. Mars is an example of a planet in the OHZ.: it is just beyond the HZ today, but had liquid water for a short time span before the Mars carbonate catastrophe, some 4 billion years ago.

== Named habitable zones for complex life ==
Over time and with more research, astronomers, cosmologists and astrobiologists have discovered more parameters needed for life. Each parameter could have a corresponding zone. Some of the named zones include:

- Ultraviolet habitable zone: a zone where the ultraviolet (UV) radiation from a star is neither too weak nor too strong for life to exist. Life needs the correct amount of ultraviolet for synthesis of biochemicals. The extent of the zone depends on the amount of ultraviolet radiation from the star, the range of UV wavelengths, the age of the star, and the atmosphere of the planet. In humans UV is used to produce vitamin D. Extreme ultraviolet (EUV) can cause atmospheric loss.
- Photosynthetic habitable zone: a zone where both long-term liquid water and oxygenic photosynthesis can occur.
- Tropospheric habitable zone, or ozone habitable zone: a zone where the planet would have the correct amount of ozone needed for life. Inhaling too much ozone causes inflammation and irritation, whereas too little troposphere ozone would produce biochemical smog. On Earth, the troposphere ozone is part of the ground-level ozone protection. Tropospheric ozone is formed by the interaction of ultraviolet light with hydrocarbons and nitrogen oxides.
- Planet rotation rate habitable zone: the zone where a planet's rotation rate is best for life. If the rotation is too slow, the day/night temperature difference is too great. The rotation rate also changes the planet's reflectivity and thus temperature, rotation as altered cloud distributions, cloud altitudes, and cloud opacities. A fast rotation rate increases wind speed on the planet. The rotation rate affects the planet's clouds and their reflectivity. Slowing the rotation rate changes cloud distributions, cloud altitudes, and cloud opacities. These changes in the clouds changes the temperature of the planet. A high rotation rate also can cause continuous, very fast winds on the surface. High rotation rates, coupled with strong Coriolis effects, generates continuous, high-speed winds by enabling the formation of persistent, fast-moving jet streams and atmospheric belts.
- Planet rotation axis tilt habitable zone, or obliquity habitable zone: the region where a stable axial tilt for a planet's rotation is maintained. Earth's axis is tilted 23.5°; this gives seasons, providing snow and ice that can melt to provide water run off in the summer. Obliquity has a major impact on a planet's temperature, thus its habitable zone.
- Tidal habitable zone. Planets too close to the star become tidally locked. The mass of the star and the distance from the star set the tidal habitable zone. A planet tidally locked has one side of the planet facing the star, this side would be very hot. The face away from the star would be well below freezing. A planet too close to the star will also have tidal heating from the star. Tidal heating can vary the planet's orbital eccentricity. Too far from the star and the planet will not receive enough solar heat.
- Astrosphere habitable zone: the zone in which a planet's astrosphere will be strong enough to protect the planet from the solar wind and cosmic rays. The astrosphere must be long lasting to protect the planet. Mars lost its water and most of its atmosphere after the losing its magnetic field and Mars carbonate catastrophe event. Star-Sun's solar wind is made of charged particles, including plasma, electrons, protons and alpha particles. The solar wind is different for each star. Earth's magnetic field is very large and has protected Earth since its formation.
- Atmosphere electric field habitable zone: the place in which the ambipolar electric field is correct for the planet's electric field to help ions overcome gravity. The planet's ionosphere must be correct to protect against the loss of the atmosphere. This is addition to a strong magnetic field to protect against the solar wind stripping away the atmosphere and water into outer space.
- Orbital eccentricity habitable zone: the zone in which planets maintain a nearly circular orbit. As orbits with eccentricity have the planets move in and out of the habitable zones. In the Solar System, the grand tack hypothesis proposes the theory of the unique placement of the gas giants, the Solar System belts and the planets near circular orbits.
- Coupled planet-moon - Magnetosphere habitable zone: the zone that planet's moon and the planet's core produce a strong magnetosphere, magnetic field to protect against the solar wind stripping away the planet's atmosphere and water into outer space. Just as Mars had a magnetic field for a short time. Earth's Moon had a large magnetosphere for several hundred million years after its formation, as proposed in a 2020 study by Saied Mighani. The Moon's magnetosphere would have given added protection of Earth's atmosphere as the early Sun was not as stable as it today. In 2020, James Green modeled the coupled planet-moon-magnetosphere habitable zone. The modeling showed a coupled planet–moon magnetosphere that would give planet the protection from stellar wind in the early Solar System. In the case of Earth, the Moon was closer to Earth in the early formation of the Solar System, giving added protection. This protection was needed then as the Sun was less stable.
- Pressure-dependent habitable zone: the zone in which planets may have the correct atmospheric pressure to have liquid surface water. With a low atmospheric pressure, the temperature at which water boils is much lower, and at pressures below that of the triple point, liquid water cannot exist. The average surface pressure on Mars today is close to that of the triple point of water; thus, liquid water cannot exist there. Planets with high-pressure atmospheres may have liquid surface water, but life forms may experience difficulty with respiratory systems in high-pressure atmospheres. As pressure increases, gas becomes denser, making it more difficult to move in and out of the lungs, also airway resistance is increased as the viscosity and density of the air mixture is greater thus the higher resistance within the airways.This greatly increases the effort required for breathing.
- Galactic habitable zone (GHZ): The GHZ, also called the Galactic Goldilocks zone, is the place in a galaxy in which heavy elements needed for a rocky planet and life are present, but also a place where strong cosmic rays will not kill life and strip the atmosphere off the planet. The term Goldilocks zone is used, as it is a fine balance between the two sites (heavy elements and strong cosmic rays). Not all galaxies are able to support life. In many galaxies, life-killing events such as gamma-ray bursts can occur. About 90% of galaxies have long and frequent gamma ray bursts, thus no life. Cosmic rays pose a threat to life. Galaxies with many stars too close together or without any dust protection also are not hospitable for life. Irregular galaxies and other small galaxies do not have enough heavy elements. Elliptical galaxies are full of lethal radiation and lack heavy elements. Large spiral galaxies, like the Milky Way, have the heavy element needed for life at the center and out to about half distance from the center bar. Not all large spiral galaxies are the same, as spiral galaxies with too much active star formation can be deadly to life. Too little star formation and the spiral arms will collapse. Not all spiral galaxies have the correct galactic ram pressure stripping parameters; too much ram pressure can deplete the galaxy of gas and thus end star formation. The Milky Way is a barred spiral galaxy, the bar is important to star formation and metallicity of the galaxy's stars and planets. A barred spiral galaxy must have stable arms with the just right star formation. Barred spiral galaxies make up about 65% of spiral galaxies, but most have too much star formation. Peculiar galaxies lack stable spiral arms, while irregular galaxies contain too many new stars and lack heavy elements. Unbarred spiral galaxies do not correct star formation and metallicity for a galactic Goldilocks zone. For long term life on a planet, the spiral arms must be stable for a long period of time, as in the Milky Way. The spiral arms must not be too close to each other, or there will be too much ultraviolet radiation. If the planet moves into or across a spiral arm, the orbits of the planets could change from gravitational disturbances. Movement across a spiral arms also would cause deadly asteroid impacts and high radiation. The planet must be in the correct place in the spiral galaxy: near the galactic center, radiation and gravitational forces are too great for life, whereas the outskirts of a spiral galaxy are metal-poor. The Sun in 28,000 light years from the center bar, in the galactic Goldilocks zone. At this distance, the Sun revolves in the galaxy at the same rate as the spiral-arm rotation, thus minimizing arm crossings.
- Supergalactic habitable zone: a place in a supercluster of galaxies that can provide for habitability of planets. The supergalactic habitable zone takes into account events in galaxies that can end habitability not only in a galaxy, but all galaxies nearby, such as galaxies merging, active galactic nucleus, starburst galaxy, supermassive black holes and merging black holes, all which output intense radiation. The supergalactic habitable zone also takes into account the abundance of various chemical elements in the galaxy, as not all galaxies or regions within have all the needed elements for life.
- Habitable zone for complex life (HZCL): the place that all the life habitable zones overlap for a long period of time, as in the Solar System. The list of habitable zones for complex life has grown longer with increasing understanding of the Universe, galaxies, and the Solar System. Complex life is normally defined as eukaryote life forms, including all animals, plants, fungi, and most unicellular organisms. Simple life forms are normally defined as prokaryotes.

== Other orbital-distance related factors ==
Some factors that depend on planetary distance and may limit complex aerobic life have not been given zone names. These include:

- Milankovitch cycle The Milankovitch cycle and ice age have been key is shaping Earth. Life on Earth today is using water melting from the last ice age. The ice ages cannot be too long or too cold for life to survive. Milankovitch cycle has an impact on the planet's obliquity also.

== Life ==
Life on Earth is carbon-based. However, some theories suggest that life could be based on other elements in the periodic table. Other elements proposed have been silicon, boron, arsenic, ammonia, methane and others. As more research has been done on life on Earth, it has been found that only carbon's organic molecules have the complexity and stability to form life. Carbon's properties allows for complex chemical bonding that produces covalent bonds needed for organic chemistry. Carbon molecules are lightweight and relatively small in size. Carbon's ability to bond to oxygen, hydrogen, nitrogen, phosphorus, and sulfur (called CHNOPS) is key to life.

== Gallery ==
Photosynthetic habitable zone has the need parameters for photosynthesis in plants. The carbohydrates produced are stored in or used by the plant. Photosynthesis is foundation of food on Earth

Troposphere habitable (Ozone habitable) zone as the correct atmospheric circulation and ozone for life. The Three Cell Model of the circulation of the planetary atmosphere of the Earth, of which the troposphere is the lowest layer.

Orbital eccentricity habitable zone is low enough orbital eccentricity to support life. Elliptic orbit by eccentricity
0.0 · 0.2 · 0.4 · 0.6 · 0.8

== See also ==
- Extraterrestrial intelligence
- Exoplanet orbital and physical parameters
- Habitability of natural satellites – liquid water on a moon
- Habitability of yellow dwarf systems – liquid water on yellow dwarf star
- Habitability of red dwarf systems – liquid water on red dwarf star
- Planetary habitability in the Solar System – liquid water in the Solar System
- Habitability of binary star systems – liquid water on binary stars
- Habitability of F-type main-sequence star systems – liquid water on planets orbiting F-type stars
- Superhabitable world – a hypothetical exoplanet
