= OHZ =

OHZ or Ohz refer to:

- Optimistic habitable zone, see Habitable zone for complex life#Named habitable zones
- Original Heidelberger Zylinder, printing press from Heidelberger Druckmaschinen
- OHZ, common abbreviation for district Osterholz (and town Osterholz-Scharmbeck), Lower Saxony, Germany; in particular the first part of the regional license plate number, also in designations with a corresponding reference to district or town
