= Habitability of F-type main-sequence star systems =

Prospects for habitable planets orbiting a type-F star

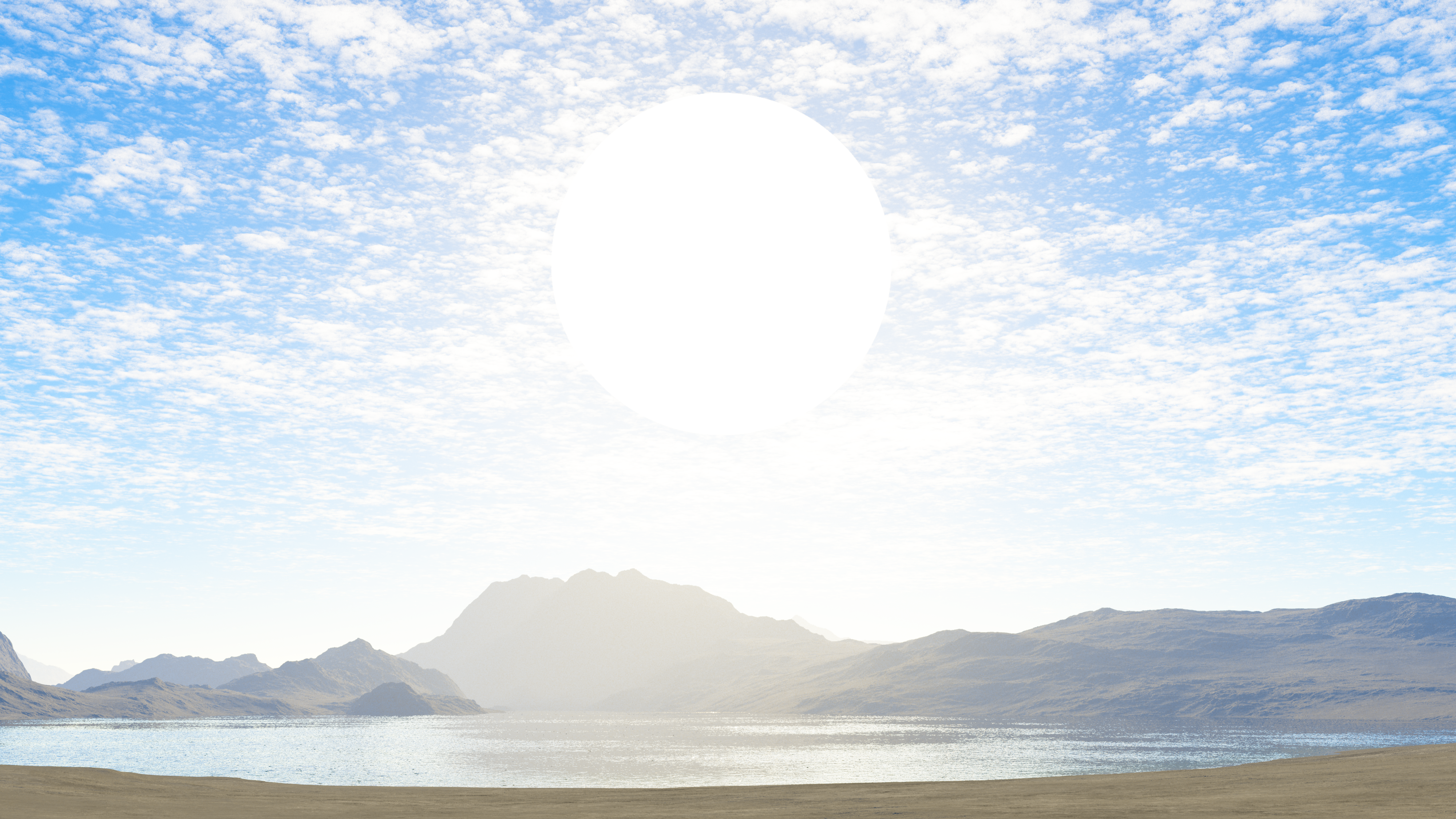
Artist's impression of tundra on a habitable planet around a spectral class F5 star

F-type main-sequence stars are thought to possibly be the hottest and most massive stars capable of hosting a planet with complex extraterrestrial life. Compared to cooler main-sequence stars of G, K and M types, F stars have shorter lifetimes and higher levels of ultraviolet radiation, which can hinder the development of life, especially complex life.

== Overview ==
One study on planets and their moons orbiting stars from F5 to F9.5 concluded that exoplanets/moons around exoplanets orbiting in habitable zones of F-type stars would receive excessive UV damage as compared to the Earth. If half a billion years is assumed as the amount of time it took for life to evolve, then the highest spectral type considerable for life-bearing planets' stars would be around A0. However, it took life on Earth a further 3 billion years to establish complexity, which probably rules out all the A-type main sequence stars for bearing complex life.

Therefore, F0 stars may be the hottest stars that live long enough to allow for the development of complex life. Putting time concerns aside, life on primordial Earth likely started in an underwater (and far underwater) environment anyway, and the water keeps the UV from reaching life-forms. In fact, it is even possible that moderately more UV could accelerate the genesis and evolution of life, fulfilling main-sequence deadlines. In addition, hotter stars would have wider habitable zones (2.0–3.7 AU for an F0 star and 1.1–2.2 AU for an F8 star as compared to 0.8–1.7 AU for the Solar System), which would be another advantage of looking for habitable planets around F type stars. If UV does indeed prove to be unendurably problematic, then according to Sato et al. (2014) a planet orbiting at the early-Mars limit around an F8 star would actually be better than Earth, receiving only 95% of the Earth's UV irradiation, and atmospheric attenuation would decrease even a Venus-like (in terms of stellar flux) planet around an F0 star's UV irradiation to less than 1 / 4 that of Earth. The best case would be an Earth-like planet at the early-Mars limit with attenuation around an F8 type star, where UV irradiance is 3.7% Earth's.

== Evolutionary changes ==
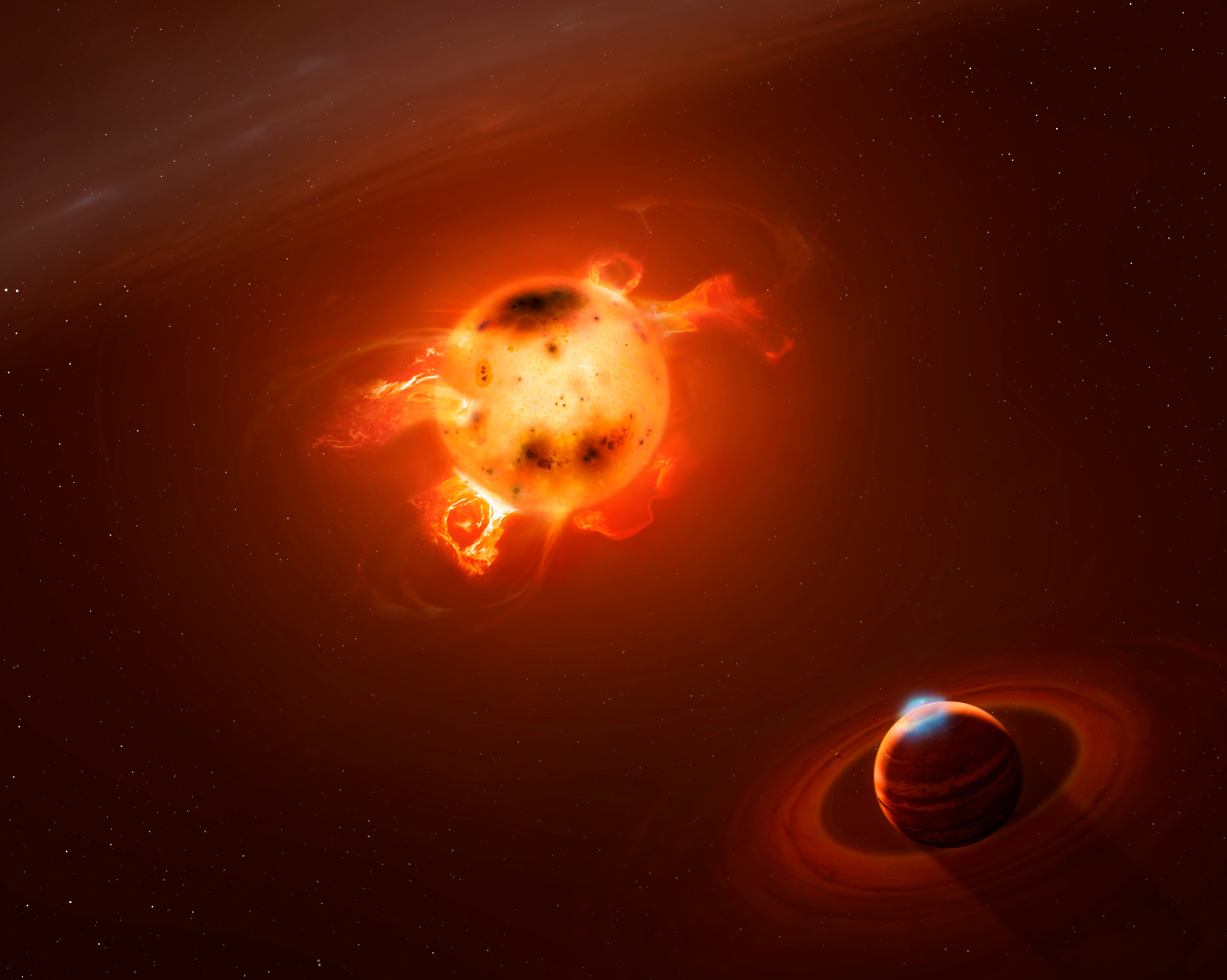
An infant star of 5 Myr, in its T Tauri phase. In the foreground, a Saturn-like planet is shown.

The greatest variation in UV irradiance occurs in a planet orbiting an F0 star with > 1.5 M_{☉} (solar masses), as opposed to an F8 or F9 star with ≤ 1.2 M_{☉} . The most dangerous phase in a star's life for orbiting habitable planets would be the first 500 million years. In some cases such as a planet at the outer edge of the habitable zone around an old F5 or F8 star, a planet can receive less UV than Earth receives.

== Frequency ==
According to the Kepler data, type M stars supposedly had more Earth-sized planets than larger, Sun-like stars (where "Sun-like" is broadly used to mean any F, G, or K type main sequence star – "FGK" type). However, in recent years, the Gaia space telescope has exposed flaws in Kepler's sampling, making it apparent that Earth-sized planets around red dwarfs are no more common than around FGK stars. As a result, the habitability of F type stars is not impaired by the overall frequency of Earth-sized planets around them. However, it does show that Earth-size planets should be extremely uncommon ( < 0.1% ) in the habitable zones of their stars. So, instead of exoplanets, some studies focus mainly on exomoons orbiting Jupiter-like planets that fall within the habitable zone. Alternatively, a study done by NASA with the same telescope gave a result saying that up to 50% of stars with temperatures between 4,300 K (type K6) and 7,300 K (type F0) had habitable planets, and the number increased to 75% when the optimistic habitable zone was used.

The habitability of F type systems may be impaired, though, by the fact that they make up only 3% of the stars in the Milky Way, compared to 6–8% for G types, 12–13% for K types, and ~70% for red dwarfs (K and M types). Further study is required to make decisive conclusions about the frequency of habitable planets around F type stars.

== Examples ==
As of 2023, there are no confirmed potentially habitable exoplanets around F type stars, but some unconfirmed Kepler candidates may be potentially habitable, including KOI-7040.01, KOI-6676.01, KOI-5202.01, and KOI-5236.01 . Upsilon Andromedae has a Jupiter-like planet in the habitable zone and could therefore have habitable exomoons. HD 10647 also has such a planet, which has a mass of > 0.94 Jupiter masses and orbits at the outer frontier of the habitable zone.

=== Upsilon Andromedae system ===
Upsilon Andromedae is another F8 type star. It has 3 confirmed Jovian planets, and Upsilon Andromedae d orbits in the star's extended habitable zone on a 1,267 day year. It orbits near the outer edge, at 2.5 AU, and has a minimum mass of 4.6 Jupiters. The habitability potential is therefore in possible Earth-like exomoons and not in the planet itself. It was the first multiple-planet system to be found around a main-sequence star (as well as, consequently, an F star) and is shown to be dynamically stable in all scenarios.

== See also ==
- 38 Virginis
- Upsilon Andromedae
- Habitability of red dwarf systems
- Habitability of K-type main-sequence star systems
- Habitability of G-type main-sequence star systems
- Earth analog
- List of Kepler exoplanet candidates in the habitable zone
- List of potentially habitable exoplanets
