= 38 Virginis b =

Super-Jupiter exoplanet orbiting 38 Virginis

Discovery
- Discovery date: 29 August 2016
- Detection method: radial velocity

Orbital characteristics
- Semi-major axis: 1.82±0.07 AU
- Eccentricity: 0.03±0.04
- Orbital period (sidereal): 825.9±6.2 days
- Time of periastron: 2455490.2 ± 177.3
- Argument of periastron: −87.3 ± 77.7
- Star: 38 Virginis

Physical characteristics
- Mass: 4.51±0.50 M_{J}

38 Virginis b is a super-Jupiter exoplanet orbiting within the habitable zone of the star 38 Virginis about 108.5 light-years (33.26 parsecs) from Earth in the constellation Virgo. The exoplanet was found by using the radial velocity method, from radial-velocity measurements via observation of Doppler shifts in the spectrum of the planet's parent star.

== Characteristics ==
38 Virginis b is a super-Jupiter, an exoplanet that has a mass larger than that of the planet Jupiter. It has a minimum mass of 4.51 M_{J}.

38 Virginis b has a circular orbit around its host star, having a period of 825.9 days (2.261 years) at a semi-major axis of 1.82 AU. This separation is within the habitable zone of its host star. As of 2025, it is the only known planet around a F-type star that orbits in the habitable zone all the time. (Note: Other planets in the habitable zones of F-type stars exist, but they occasionally orbit beyond the zone.) Since 38 Virginis b is a gas giant, the habitability is instead considered for its hypothetical exomoons.

== Host star ==
The planet orbits a (F-type) star named 38 Virginis. The star has a mass of 1.18 M_{☉} and a radius of around 1.46 R_{☉}. It has a temperature of 6557 K and is about 1.9 billion years old. In comparison, the Sun is about 4.6 billion years old and has a temperature of 5778 K. The star is metal-rich, with a metallicity ([Fe/H]) of 0.16, or 117% the solar amount. Its luminosity (L_{☉}) is 3.48 times that of the Sun. (Note: From $\begin{smallmatrix}L=4 \pi R^2 \sigma T_{\rm eff}^4 \end{smallmatrix}$, where $\begin{smallmatrix}L \end{smallmatrix}$ is the luminosity, $\begin{smallmatrix}R \end{smallmatrix}$ is the radius, $\begin{smallmatrix}T_{\rm eff}\end{smallmatrix}$ is the effective surface temperature and $\begin{smallmatrix}\sigma \end{smallmatrix}$ is the Stefan–Boltzmann constant.)

The star's apparent magnitude, or how bright it appears from Earth's perspective, is 6.11. Therefore, 38 Virginis is on the edge of not being visible to the naked eye, but it can be clearly spotted with binoculars.

== Discovery ==
The search for 38 Virginis b started when its host star was chosen an ideal target for a planet search using the radial velocity method (in which the gravitational pull of a planet on its star is measured by observing the resulting Doppler shift), as stellar activity would not overly mask or mimic Doppler spectroscopy measurements. It was also confirmed that 38 Virginis is neither a binary star nor a quickly rotating star, common false positives when searching for transiting planets. Analysis of the resulting data found that the radial velocity variations most likely indicated the existence of a planet. The net result was an estimate of a 4.52 M_{J} planetary companion orbiting the star at a distance of 1.82 AU with an eccentricity of 0.03.

The discovery of 38 Virginis b was reported in the online repository arXiv on August 29, 2016.
