= Habitability of brown dwarf systems =

Potential for life-friendly planets orbiting brown dwarfs

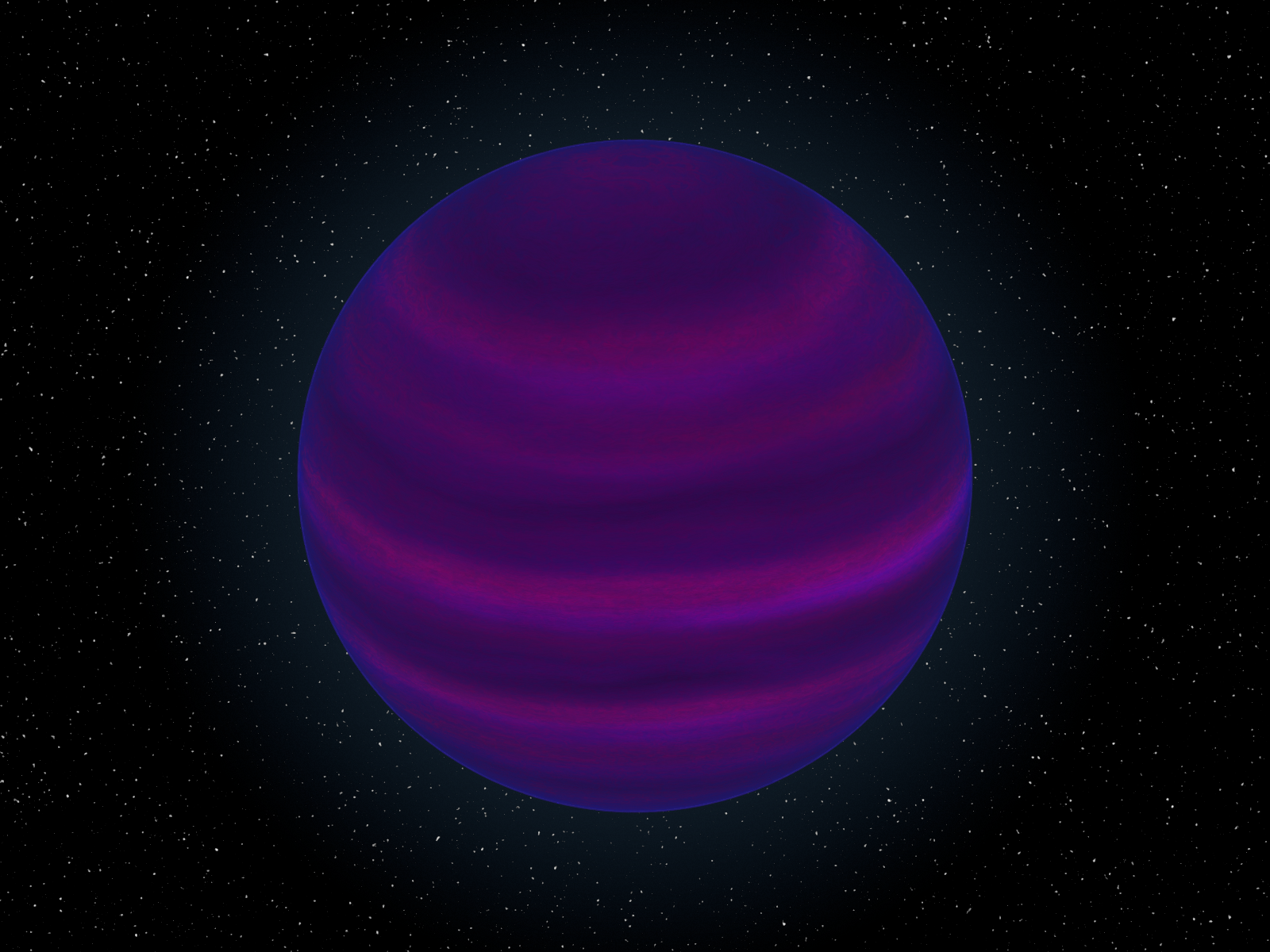
Artist's interpretation of a brown dwarf

The habitability of brown dwarf planets is considered less plausible than for main-sequence stars, due to the cooling central dwarf and tidal forces due to super close-in HZ, but more plausible than for white dwarfs due to the lesser XUV and X-ray output. The planet would have to have an extremely low orbital eccentricity (ranging from Earth-like to ten-millionths depending on semimajor axis and brown dwarf mass) to avoid a tidal runaway greenhouse effect, and a planet's water and atmosphere may not survive the early stage when the planet is interior to the HZ.

== Details ==
=== Ubiquity ===
Brown dwarfs are estimated to be roughly 1/3 as frequent as M dwarfs in the solar neighborhood, with more massive ones outnumbering less massive ones, and research suggests that small rocky worlds are common around ultra-low-mass objects (ultra-cool dwarf stars as well as brown dwarfs). When tidal migration is considered, the lower limit for the probability of habitable-zone transitors around brown dwarfs within 7 pc is 4.5% (56% w/out tidal migration).

=== Detection ===
Due to their short orbital periods, transiting planets orbiting brown dwarfs would be very quickly detected and confirmed, potentially even in one night if the orbital period is less than 8–10 hours. For a 0.04-solar mass dwarf, the orbital period would range from 10–55 hours for an age of 1 Gyr to ~4 hours for an age of 10 Gyrs. The transits would be very deep (1-5%) due to the small radius of the parent brown dwarf, although they would also be very short (10–40 minutes). Biosignatures would also be more easily detectable by JWST for brown dwarfs due to their small radius relative to their planets, with a maximum spectral type of ~M5V for a distance of 6.5 pc.

=== Habitability ===
The aging of the object would result in a shorter habitable zone duration for lower-mass objects, as they cool faster, and eventually the Roche limit becomes a problem. For a 0.04-solar mass object, the maximum HZ time would be 4 Gyrs, and for a 0.07-solar-mass object, it would be up to 10 Gyrs. An HZ duration under 0.1 Gyrs would be problematic for the development of complex life, which mostly rules out the lowest-mass objects. That said, life-bearing conditions could still continue in a subsurface (i.e., Enceladus-like) state after the HZ moves interior to the planet's orbit.

For a 0.04-solar mass dwarf, the eccentricity of the orbiting planet would have to be on the order of 10^{−7} to prevent tidal Venus conditions at an age of 10 Gyrs. For a younger object of 1 Gyr, the eccentricity would still have to be very low (0.00005).

Early-life desiccation is another issue, as according to, a habitable-mass (0.1-10 Earth-masses) planet with an initial semimajor axis of 0.009 AU would require 50 Myrs to reach the HZ of a 0.04 solar-mass brown dwarf, close to the approximate amount of time it takes to desiccate the planet. The model used suggests that a planet must have a minimum initial semimajor axis of 0.016 AU to avoid desiccation due to time spent interior to the HZ. Also, the tidal forces would push the planet's orbit outward, shortening the HZ duration.

== See also ==
- Habitability of red dwarf systems
