= Habitability of K-type main-sequence star systems =

K-type main-sequence stars, also known as orange dwarfs or Goldilocks stars, may be candidates for supporting extraterrestrial life. Due to their smaller mass, they remain stable in the main sequence longer than the Sun by burning their hydrogen slower, whilst also maintaining sufficiently-low solar-flare activity and a habitable zone large enough to prevent tidal locking to sustain life. The odds of complex life arising may be better on planets around K-type main sequence stars than around Sun-like stars, given the suitable temperature and extra time available for it to evolve. Some known exoplanets orbiting these stars are possible candidates for hosting life.

== Habitable zone ==
A K-type star's habitable zone approximately ranges between 0.1–0.4 to 0.3–1.3 astronomical units from the star, from which exoplanets receive relatively low amounts of ultraviolet (UV) radiation and relatively high levels of infrared (IR) radiation; relatively high levels of IR radiation raise surface temperatures extending the habitable zone outward in relation to the freezing point of water, whereas excessive UV radiation can harm developing or existing life, low levels of UV may prevent life from initiating and thereafter evolving.

K-type stars are stable in their main sequence phases, lasting for most of the K-type main-sequence star's main sequence phase and with little instability of luminosity during that phase.

== Radiation hazard ==
61 Cygni, a binary K-type star system

Despite K-stars' lower total UV output, in order for their planets to have habitable temperatures, they must orbit much nearer to their K-star hosts, offsetting or reversing any advantage of a lower total UV output. There is also growing evidence that K-type dwarf stars emit dangerously high levels of X-rays and far ultraviolet (FUV) radiation for considerably longer into their early main sequence phase than do either heavier G-type stars or lighter early M-type dwarf stars. This prolonged radiation saturation period may sterilise, destroy the atmospheres of, or at least delay the emergence of life for Earth-like planets orbiting inside the habitable zones around K-type dwarf stars.

== Potentially habitable planets ==
The super-Earth HD 40307 g around the K2.5V star HD 40307 orbits in the circumstellar habitable zone (CHZ), although it has a reasonably elliptical orbit (e=0.22). There may be many more, and the Kepler space telescope (now retired) was one of the main sources of information of these exoplanets. Kepler-62 and Kepler-442 are examples of discoveries by Kepler of systems consisting of a K-type dwarf with potentially habitable planets orbiting it.

HD 85512 b was originally thought to be a super-Earth with habitability potential orbiting a K-type main-sequence star, but it is now considered to be a false positive detection, an artifact caused by stellar rotation.

== See also ==
- Astrobiology
- Habitable zone
- Habitability of G-type main-sequence star systems
- Habitability of F-type main-sequence star systems
- Habitability of neutron star systems
- Habitability of red dwarf systems
- Habitability of G-type main-sequence star systems
- Planetary habitability
- Stellar influences on an origin of life setting and Ultraviolet habitable zone
