= Habitability of neutron star systems =

Possible factors for life on planets or moons around neutron stars

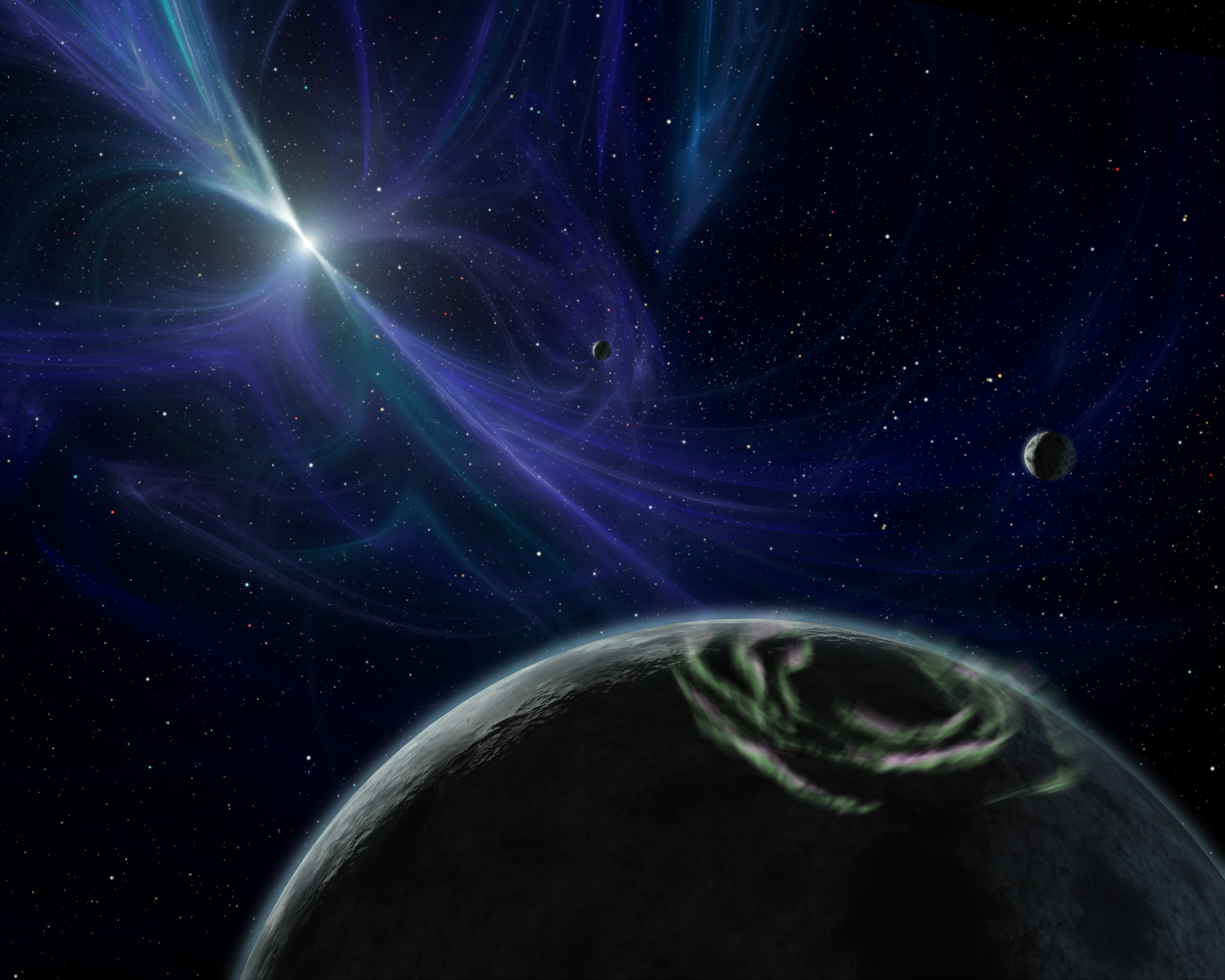
An artist's vision of the planets around the neutron star Lich: PSR B1257+12.

The habitability of neutron star systems is the potential of planets and moons orbiting a neutron star to provide suitable habitats for life. Of the roughly 3,000 neutron stars known, only a handful have sub-stellar companions. The most famous of these are the low-mass planets around the millisecond pulsar PSR B1257+12.

Habitability is defined conventionally by the equilibrium temperature of a planet, which is a function of the amount of incoming radiation; a planet is defined "habitable" if liquid water can exist on its surface although even planets with little external energy can harbour underground life. Pulsars do not emit large quantities of radiation given their small size; the habitable zone can easily end up lying so close to the star that tidal force effects destroy the planets. Also, it is often unclear how much radiation a given pulsar emits and how much of it can actually reach a hypothetical planet's surface; of the known pulsar planets, only those of PSR B1257+12 are close to the habitable zone and as of 2015, no known pulsar planet is likely to be habitable.

A habitable planet orbiting a neutron star must be between one and 10 times the mass of Earth. If a planet is lighter, its atmosphere will be lost. Its atmosphere must also be thick enough to convert the intense X-ray radiation from the neutron star into heat on its surface, allowing it to have a temperature suitable for life.

A magnetic field around a planet, a magnetosphere, if strong enough, could protect a planet from the strong stellar winds. This could preserve the planet's atmosphere for several billion years. Such a planet could have liquid water on its surface.

A Dutch research team published an article on the subject in the journal Astronomy & Astrophysics in December 2017.

== See also ==
- Habitability of red dwarf systems
- Habitability of K-type main-sequence star systems
- Habitability of natural satellites
- Neutron stars in fiction
