= Stellar influences on an origin of life setting =

The origin of life is an ongoing field of research that requires the study of interactions of many physical and biological processes. One of these physical processes has to do with the characteristics of the host star of a planet, and how stellar influences on an origin of life setting can dictate how life evolves, if at all. Life required an energy source at its origin, and scientists have long speculated that this energy source could have been the ultraviolet radiation that rains down on Earth. Though it may potentially be harmful to life, UV has also been shown to trigger important prebiotic reactions that might have taken place on a younger Earth.

Main sequence M dwarf stars are generally the focus of studies that investigate the role of UV in prebiotic chemistry and an origin of life setting, given that the potential habitability of planets in these systems is a big field of research, and the lifecycles and characteristics of these stars are relatively well known. Furthermore, in the context of biosignatures, M dwarfs are considered one of the better places to look to find life for various reasons (see: habitability of M dwarfs). In order to experimentally investigate the effects of UV on the origin of life, studies make use of UV sources such as mercury lamps, and computational simulations of radiative transfer that model how UV interacts with different atmospheric compositions with different levels of shielding. Altogether, these methods allow scientists to test how different aspects of prebiotic chemistry operate under conditions of UV (so called 'light chemistry') versus how they operate in conditions with reduced UV or none at all ('dark chemistry').

This work is helpful for understanding the conditions under which life might have started on a prebiotic Earth and can also be used to identify exoplanets that may have the right conditions for life. Since the first discovery in 1992, more than 5000 exoplanets have been found, and a subset of these exist within the liquid water habitable zone of their host star. By experimentally estimating how much light is needed for UV photochemistry based on reaction rates for light chemistry versus dark chemistry, scientists have designated another zone around a star, called the 'abiogenesis zone'. This is based on an understanding of how proximity to a host star changes the flux of UV, and how that influences prebiotic chemistry. A planet existing within overlap of the habitable zone with the abiogenesis zone of a given star would theoretically provide the right conditions for life to evolve there.

== UV and abiogenesis ==
UV light is considered a key component of prebiotic chemistry on an early Earth. Because of their short wavelengths (10-400 nanometers), UV photons carry enough energy to effect the electronic structure of molecules by interacting with molecular bonds by breaking them (photolysis), ionizing them (photoionization), or exciting their electrons (photoexcitation). This can sometimes lead to degradation of biologically important molecules, causing subsequent environmental stress and providing a barrier to abiogenesis. In 1973, Carl Sagan first suggested that UV might pose a selection threat against abiogenesis because early biological repair mechanisms would have been more primitive than now, and early prebiotic chemistry would have faced intense selection pressure to shield against UV.

Conversely, these potentially destructive properties are also what makes UV an ideal candidate for a source of energy, similar to the Miller-Urey experiment that synthesized prebiotic molecules using simulated lightning. Across many different studies of prebiotic chemistry, UV light has been incorporated to explain the origin of chirality, the synthesis of amino acids, and the formation of ribonucleotides. Due to a lack of biogenic UV-shielding O_{2} and O_{3} present in the prebiotic atmosphere, and the fact that a younger Sun at the time had a higher fractional output of UV (see: the young sun paradox), UV is expected to have been common in the prebiotic environment. One study suggested that in the absence of O_{3}, UV light with at wavelengths < 300 nm contributed 3 orders of magnitude more energy than electrical discharge to the surface of an early Earth.

=== Experimental methods ===
Given that UV may have been the most available source of energy for prebiotic chemistry, many experiments aim to deduce and quantify the effects of UV irradiance on synthesis pathways. A fraction of these studies deal with the formation of prebiotic molecules on interstellar ices and cometary surfaces. For this, UV is sourced from lamps or synchrotrons in ultrahigh vacuum conditions, and the UV output is generally below a wavelength of 160 nm. Other studies are interested in prebiotic chemistry that occurred in aqueous solution, and also make use of UV lamps. UV lamps are a good source because they are safe, stable, and affordable. However their output is generally narrowband, and real solar UV output is broadband.

Many UV-dependent prebiotic reactions are wavelength dependent, so research using the narrowband UV lamps may not reach the same conclusions as those conducted under more realistic conditions. There are many studies that include UV as a key component of their prebiotic synthesis pathways. In particular, a ribonucleotide synthesis and a sugar synthesis pathway both rely on irradiation from a mercury UV lamp. For all studies, and the se two in particular, early Solar UV irradiation and variability would have heavily influenced the availability of prebiotically important feedstock gases like CH_{4} and HCN (hydrogen cyanide). And although the effects are difficult to constrain due to lack of a full understanding of what the prebiotic Earth environment looked like, understanding how prebiotic chemistry might have proceeded in the presence of solar UV is one step towards a better understanding of abiogenesis.

==== Ribonucleotide synthesis ====
A key issue facing the RNA world hypothesis, and the eventual pathway to abiogenesis, is how the comparatively complex RNA molecules actually came to be. One proposed pathway to RNA synthesis under plausible prebiotic conditions used irradiation from UV light at 254 nm. The UV here plays two roles: first, it destroys competing molecules that are generated along the synthesis pathway, and secondly, it was required to promote the synthesis via photoactivation.

==== Simple sugar synthesis ====
A proposed companion synthesis reaction of two- and three-carbon sugars glycolaldehyde and glyceraldehyde from hydrogen cyanide (HCN) and formaldehyde also requires UV irradiation. Previously, the mechanism used to explain the prebiotic synthesis of sugars was the formose reaction, wherein formaldehyde polymerizes to form longer sugars. This polymerization tends to run away, and leads to an insoluble tar, effectively terminating the reaction. The UV-driven synthesis, however, is much more selective and generates a smaller number of products that are useful for further chemical reactions. This synthesis relies of production of solvated electrons and protons via photoionization of a photocatalytic transition metal complex under UV light at 254 nm.

== Stellar influence ==
Further considerations of environments conducive to prebiotic chemistry extend beyond how the Sun influenced Earth, and are interested in how other stars and their different characteristics might affect abiogenesis on other planets as well. Stars are not stagnant; from when they first start fusing hydrogen on the main sequence, to when they reach the end stages of their lifetimes, they are outputting energy in the form of radiation and high energy particles. Radiation can be, for example, x-ray coronal emissions or flares. The high energy particles emitted come in the forms of winds, and coronal mass ejections (CMEs). As stars evolve, so do their emissions; younger stars tend to be the most active, meaning they have stronger winds, larger flaring events, and an increased frequency of CMEs. This means that planets orbiting younger stars would endure more volatile stellar events that impact their habitable and abiogenesis zones, perhaps even making them transient.

M dwarf stars range in temperature from 2,000 to 3,500 K, and they exhibit variable activity over both short and long timescales. For example, in one study of 177 M dwarfs of varying spectral times, 75% of them exhibited long-term variability. Stellar activity is linked to rotation, so the fraction of active stars tends to be much higher amongst M dwarfs compared to solar-type stars (G type). This is because they tend to have longer rotational braking times (timescale for stellar rotation to slow), and show stronger activity based on their period of rotation. Deducing the right balance of stellar activity required to help prebiotic chemistry along without completely sterilizing the surface of a planet is complicated. It depends on multiple stellar and planetary factors, such as frequency of stellar events, intensity of stellar events, planetary atmosphere composition (radiation shielding effects), and the existence and strength of a planetary magnetic field (can provide further shielding).

=== M dwarf UV shortage ===
Although M dwarfs exhibit high variability, because of their low luminosities they emit less prebiotically relevant near-UV (NUV) radiation, which can lead to a shortage thereof. Additionally, planetary atmospheres of specific compositions can further increase this shortage by functioning as UV shields due to the absorption features of their constituent molecules. This acts to reduce the amount of stellar UV reaching the surface, and can act as a barrier to UV-driven prebiotic chemistry. For example, planets orbiting M dwarfs with inefficient atmospheric sinks of O_{2} and CO, combined with a CO_{2} rich atmosphere are more likely to built up UV shields such as O_{3} that can block the already low NUV flux reaching the surface from the star.

==== Potential solutions ====
Effects like this can be theoretically overcome in a number of ways, both to do with characteristics of the star and the planet in question. Firstly, this issue could be overcome simply by having a thinner atmosphere that blocks less of the impinging UV. This kind of situation could arise in the case where elevated UV emission from the M dwarf strips the atmosphere of habitable zone planets orbiting close enough in. Relative dose rates of UV to the surface would then increase. However, it is likely that the increased UV only served to promote destructive reactions such as photolysis of a prebiotically relevant RNA monomer. This is because the thinner atmosphere was admitting destructive far-UV (FUV) wavelengths and making the environment inclement to abiogenesis. Thus, atmospheric stripping is not deemed an effective way to solve the M dwarf UV shortage problem.

Alternatively, researchers considered whether M dwarf flaring might play a role in providing the requisite UV for abiogenesis. Typically, these kinds of flaring events are deemed fatal for life, because of the increase in output of NUV. Given that flaring is cyclical, there exists a possible scenario whereby photosensitive prebiotic chemistry is promoted during the flares, and ceases in the intervening periods. This kind of situation is analogous to terrestrial day/night cycles, and is proposed as the best mechanism to solve the shortage problem around particularly active M dwarfs. That being said, further work is needed in order to constrain whether shorter duration/higher intensity UV flux from a flare is even sufficient to promote prebiotic chemistry. Additionally, intense flaring events run the risk of completely ablating a planetary atmosphere, which would sterilize the surface, and effectively counteract this proposed solution.

=== Alternative stellar classes ===
Main sequence M dwarfs are not the only stellar host considered in studies of UV prebiotic chemistry. Younger M dwarfs, such as the pre-main sequence ones emit more of their bolometric luminosity in the NUV range. Depending on how low their mass is, some of these stars remain in this state for up to 1 Gyr (billion year). From here, it is possible to begin assessing whether planets orbiting a star in these conditions might receive NUV insolation that is actually comparable to solar-like stars (G type). That being said, earlier type M dwarf stars have higher bolometric luminosity, which increases the likelihood of their orbiting habitable zone planets undergoing a runaway greenhouse state if they are orbiting closer in. Temperatures under these conditions would reach > 1000 K and easily vaporize any water on the surface. Consequently, aqueous-phase (in water) prebiotic chemistry is unlikely to proceed which is a definite barrier to aqueous prebiotic chemistry.

For planets further from the star in the habitable zone during this pre-main sequence phase, they may achieve habitable conditions and even abiogenesis for up to Gyr timescales. The caveat to this is that once their host star exits the pre-main sequence phase, the total bolometric luminosity will decrease, and the planets will no longer exist within the habitable zone. Unless clement temperatures are maintained by some intrinsic planetary mechanism such as greenhouse warming liquid water will freeze, and if life is not immediately killed off it would be confined to volcanic or subsurface reservoirs. All the cons aside, planets in the habitable zones of these late-type, low mass pre-main sequence M dwarfs are still an area of focus for researchers interested in UV-driven prebiotic chemistry.

==== K-type ====
Going beyond M dwarf stars, main sequence K dwarf stars are also considered as possible hosts of habitable and abiogenetic planets. Based on a chemical pathway for photochemically building up prebiotic reservoirs, it is possible that hotter stars, such as spectral type K are better at powering prebiotic chemistry. A main sequence K star (spectral class: K5), has a temperature of around 4400 K. For stars cooler than this, and in the absence of cyclical stellar activity, the incident flux is too low for the planets that exist within the habitable zone to also exist within the abiogenesis zone. This consequently sets a potential boundary on what kinds of stars are most likely to have sufficient overlap in their habitable and abiogenesis zones.

== Prebiotic Earth UV conditions ==
Just as understanding the UV flux of different stars can somewhat constrain favorable conditions for abiogenesis, so does understanding what the UV environment would have looked like on a prebiotic Earth. Given certain atmospheric compositions, UV surface fluence is generally a function of albedo, and solar zenith angle (SZA). In experimental situations where atmospheric composition is left as a free variable, it also heavily dictates not only the bolometric surface flux of UV, but also what particular wavelengths are transmitted that may or may not be harmful to prebiotic chemistry and abiogenesis. This presents the need for experiments to reduce the uncertainty still surrounding the planetary conditions and the surface UV at abiogenesis.

For consideration of the surficial UV conditions of a prebiotic Earth, there are 7 atmospheric gases that can influence UV attenuation and hence prebiotic chemistry: CO_{2}, SO_{2}, H_{2}S, CH_{4}, H_{2}O, O_{2}, and O_{3}. For each of these gases, different constraints provide different estimates for their effect on UV transmission. Depending on the amount of transmission, different biologically effective doses (BEDs) of UV will be delivered to the surface; too little prohibits prebiotic chemistry, and too much is harmful. Additionally, solar UV input shapes the overall photochemistry of Earth's atmosphere which impacts the availability of chemical reactants.

=== Carbon dioxide (CO_{2}) ===
One study showed that high levels of atmospheric CO_{2} can suppress UV-relevant prebiotic chemistry, due to the argument that atmospheric CO_{2} would cut off UV fluence for wavelengths shorter than 204 nm. This reduces the surface flux of photons at energies useful for prebiotic chemistry. At lower levels of atmospheric CO_{2} however, the transmitted UV can moderately enhance prebiotic chemistry. This study found the overall effects of CO_{2} on the BED of UV to be minimal, in the absence of other absorbers. For the range of CO_{2} values evaluated, the variation of the biologically effective dose of radiation was <2 orders of magnitude.

However, given the significant presence of other absorbers (below) that have absorption cross sections from 100 to 500 nm, they could have influenced the surface UV environment of an early Earth.

=== Sulfur dioxide (SO_{2}) ===
SO_{2} strongly absorbs over a much wider range than CO_{2}, but is conversely more vulnerable to loss via photolysis and oxidation reactions. Volcanos are a significant source of SO_{2}, and assuming levels of volcanic outgassing at abiogenesis (around 3.9 Ga) were comparable to today, the build-up of SO_{2} would not significantly influence the surface UV environment. However, during transiently high levels of volcanic outgassing SO_{2} would build-up, and under these conditions could have heavily modified surface UV irradiance. Higher levels of SO_{2} reduce BEDs by over 60 orders of magnitude, which implies that UV-driven prebiotic chemistry might not have been sustained.

=== Hydrogen sulfide (H_{2}S) ===
Like SO_{2}, H_{2}S is a strong and broad absorber of UV, and is primarily generated through volcanic outgassing. As a result of its vulnerability to atmospheric loss through photolysis and oxidation reactions, it is not expected that H_{2}S would have been a significant constituent of a prebiotic environment, let alone that it might have had an impact on prebiotic chemistry. As with SO_{2}, higher levels of H_{2}S as a result of a transient increase in volcanic activity, may have affected the surface UV irradiation. The lower expected BEDs might have reduced the ability of some prebiotic chemical pathways to proceed.

=== Methane (CH_{4}) ===
In the presence of trace amounts of CO_{2}, UV absorption by CH_{4} is considered negligible. This is because CH_{4} absorbs UV below 165 nm. As a result, CH_{4} is not very useful for constraining surface UV in the presence of CO_{2}.

=== Water (H_{2}O) ===
Primordial atmospheric water content is hard to constrain, but it is a strong UV absorber for wavelengths below 198 nm. For plausible levels of H_{2}O, UV flux is blocked below around 201 nm even without attenuation from CO_{2}. This means that regardless of the level of CO_{2} present at a given time, UV more energetic than around 200 nm would have probably been unavailable for prebiotic chemistry.

=== Molecular oxygen (O_{2}) ===
O_{2} is a strong shield for UV, but at levels expected from photochemical models, O_{2} does not provide strong constraints on the surface UV environment. However, given that O_{2} is a stronger absorber than CO_{2}, it is possible that O_{2} might have an effect in situations where CO_{2} is a smaller constituent in the atmosphere. At such high levels, O_{2} may start to have a noticeable effect on UV transmission, but at abiogenesis it is unlikely that high levels were achieved given a strong reducing sink from volcanogenic gases, and a lack of a strong source.

=== Ozone (O_{3}) ===
Ozone is a well known greenhouse gas that acts as a shield for UV. It is generated in the atmosphere via photolysis of O_{2}, hence its abundance is linked to that of O_{2}. At nominal O_{2} values expected for around abiogenesis, O_{3} is not expected to have a huge influence on the surface UV.

== Considerations for biosignatures ==
Prebiotic chemistry is heavily linked to UV irradiation from the host star of the planet. In particular, frequency flaring from M dwarf stars might be enough to drive prebiotic photochemistry on terrestrial planets within their habitable zone. This does require that the atmosphere can survive the flaring and not be fully ablated thus sterilizing the surface. But under those conditions, flaring rates for stars, and particularly M dwarfs early in their evolution is relevant to biosignature detection.

Detecting a biosignature requires finding a planet where life has existed long enough to noticeably change the planet in detectable ways either through its surface or atmosphere (see: biosphere). Given that UV impacts prebiotic chemistry, understanding stellar UV variations is an important step on the way to finding potential candidates for biosignature searches, as well as understanding more about abiogenesis on Earth.
