= 38 Virginis =

F-type main sequence star in the constellation Virgo

Observation data Epoch J2000.0 Equinox ICRS
- Constellation: Virgo
- Right ascension: 12^{h} 53^{m} 11.15678^{s}
- Declination: −03° 33′ 11.1513″
- Apparent magnitude (V): 6.135±0.037

Characteristics
- Evolutionary stage: main sequence
- Spectral type: F6V
- B−V color index: 0.49

Astrometry
Radial velocity (R_{v})	−7.30±0.32 km/s
Proper motion (μ)	RA: −262.971 mas/yr Dec.: −3.649 mas/yr
Parallax (π)	29.9081±0.0377 mas
Distance	109.1 ± 0.1 ly (33.44 ± 0.04 pc)

Details
Mass	1.18±0.12 M_{☉}
Radius	1.45±0.07 R_{☉}
Luminosity	3.22 L_{☉}
Temperature	6557±96 K
Metallicity [Fe/H]	+0.07 dex
Rotation	8.2 days
Rotational velocity (v sin i)	28.43 km/s
Age	1.9+0.6 −0.7 Gyr

Other designations
- BD−02 3593, HD 111998, HIP 62875, HR 4891, WDS J12532-0333

Database references
SIMBAD	data

38 Virginis is an F-type main sequence star in the constellation of Virgo. With an apparent magnitude of 6.135, it is very close to the average threshold for naked eye visibility, and can only be viewed from sufficiently dark skies, far from light pollution. It is around 109.1 light years distant from the Earth.

== Nomenclature ==
The name 38 Virginis derives from the star being the 38th star in order of right ascension catalogued in the constellation Virgo by Flamsteed in his star catalogue. The designation b of 38 Virginis b derives from the order of discovery and is given to the first planet orbiting a given star, followed by the other lowercase letters of the alphabet. In the case of 38 Virginis, only one was discovered, which was designated b.

== Characteristics ==
38 Virginis is an F-type main sequence star that is approximately 118% the mass of and 145% the radius of the Sun. It has a temperature of 6557 K and is about 1.9 billion years old. In comparison, the Sun is about 4.6 billion years old and has a temperature of 5778 K.

The star is metal-rich, with a metallicity ([Fe/H]) of 0.07 dex, or 117% the solar amount. Its luminosity (L_{☉}) is 3.22 times that of the Sun.

A companion star is cataloged in the CCDM at a separation of half an arcsecond.

== Planetary system ==
The 38 Virginis planetary system
Companion (in order from star)	Mass	Semimajor axis (AU)	Orbital period (days)	Eccentricity	Inclination (°)	Radius
b	4.51±0.5 M_{J}	1.82±0.07	825.9±6.2	0.03±0.04	—	—

The star is known to host one exoplanet, 38 Virginis b, discovered in 2016. It has a mass of around 4.5 times that of the planet Jupiter, an orbital period of 825.9 days (2.261 years) and a relatively low eccentricity out of any long-period giant exoplanet discovered, with an eccentricity of 0.03.

The planet lies within the host star's habitable zone. As of 2024, it is the only known planet around an F-type star that is always orbiting inside the habitable zone, as opposed to an orbit that never or just occasionally crosses the HZ.
