= Habitability of natural satellites =

Measure of the potential of natural satellites to have environments hospitable to life

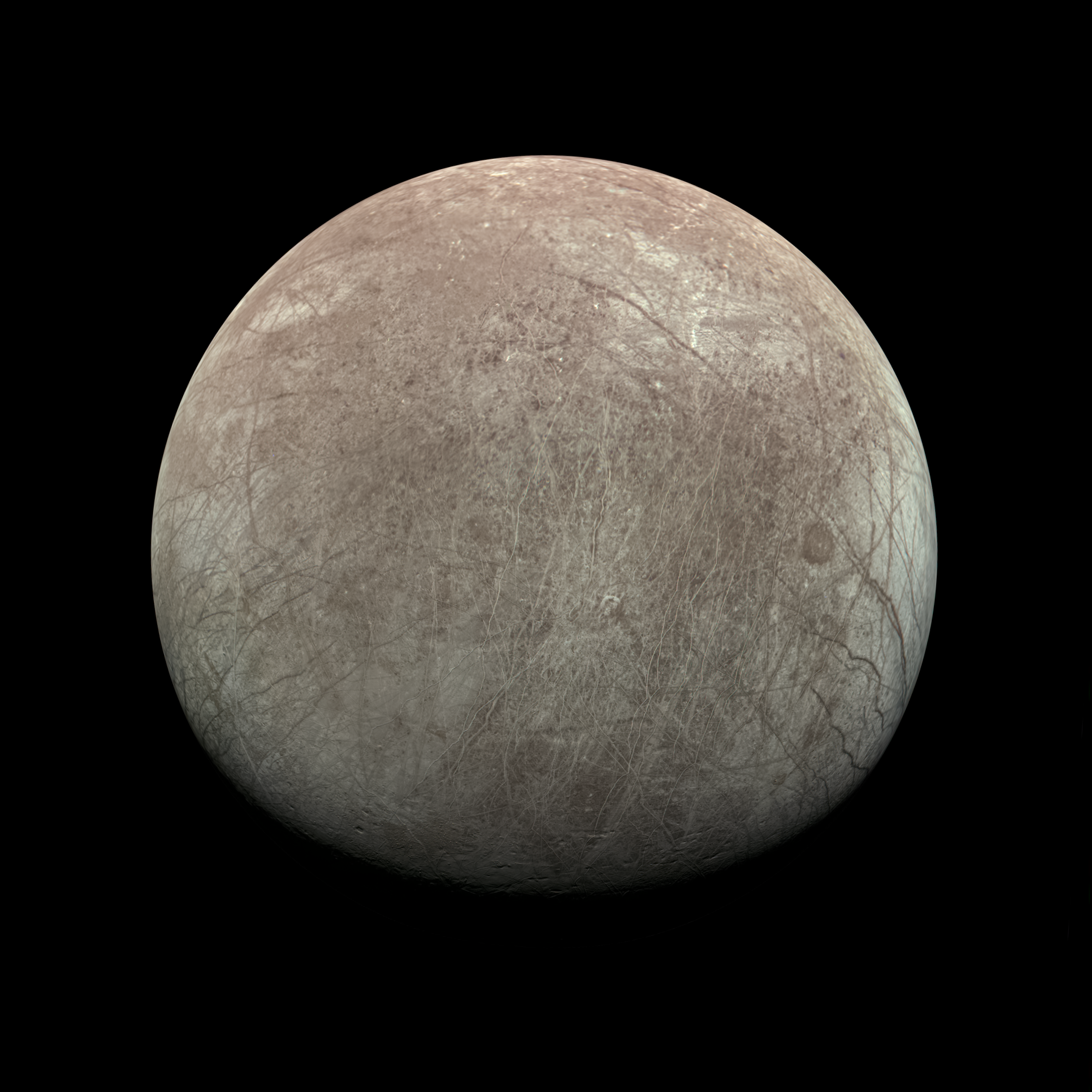
Europa, a potentially habitable moon of Jupiter

The habitability of natural satellites is the potential of moons to provide habitats for life. Natural satellites are expected to outnumber planets by a large margin and the study of their habitability is therefore important to astrobiology and the search for extraterrestrial life. Planetary mass, atmosphere, and geology are all important factors but there are significant environmental variables specific to moons.

All planetary mass moons of the Solar System are tidally locked, the most significant difference in comparison to the planetary habitability of bodies that have "cleared their neighbourhood." They also tend to have more surface area relative to volume, thus dissipating heat and atmosphere quickly, as well as orbital resonances with other moons that stabilize their orbits but can lead to a stasis inimical to natural selection. With a surficial solvent, thick atmosphere, and dominant size over satellite companions within the Saturnian system, Titan best meets the known habitability criteria within the solar system though at great distance from the sun.

Research suggests that deep biospheres like that of Earth are also possible. The strongest candidates therefore are currently icy satellites such as those of Jupiter and Saturn—Europa and Enceladus respectively, in which subsurface liquid water is thought to exist. While the lunar surface is hostile to life as we know it, a deep lunar biosphere (or that of similar bodies) cannot yet be ruled out; deep exploration would be required for confirmation.

Exomoons are not yet confirmed to exist and their detection may be limited to transit-timing variation, which is not currently sufficiently sensitive. It is possible that some of their attributes could be found through study of their transits. Despite this, some scientists estimate that there are as many habitable exomoons as habitable exoplanets. Given the general planet-to-satellite(s) mass ratio of 10,000, gas giants in the habitable zone are thought to be the best candidates to harbour Earth-like moons.

Tidal forces are likely to play as significant a role providing heat as stellar radiation.

== Presumed conditions ==
The conditions of habitability for natural satellites are similar to those of planetary habitability. However, there are several factors which differentiate a natural satellite's habitability and additionally extend their habitability outside the planetary habitable zone.

=== Liquid water ===
Liquid water is thought by most astrobiologists to be an essential prerequisite for extraterrestrial life. There is growing evidence of subsurface liquid water on several moons in the Solar System orbiting the gas giants Jupiter, Saturn, Uranus, and Neptune. However, none of these subsurface bodies of water has been confirmed to date.

=== Orbital stability ===
For a stable orbit the ratio between the moon's orbital period P_{s} around its primary star P_{p} must be < 1/9, e.g. if a planet takes 90 days to orbit its star, the maximum stable orbit for a moon of that planet is less than 10 days. Simulations suggest that a moon with an orbital period less than about 45 to 60 days will remain safely bound to a massive giant planet or brown dwarf that orbits 1 AU from a Sun-like star.

=== Atmosphere ===
An atmosphere is considered by astrobiologists to be important in developing prebiotic chemistry, sustaining life and for surface water to exist. Most natural satellites in the Solar System lack significant atmospheres, the sole exception being Saturn's moon Titan.

Sputtering, a process whereby atoms are ejected from a solid target material due to bombardment of the target by energetic particles, presents a significant problem for natural satellites. All the gas giants in the Solar System, and likely those orbiting other stars, have magnetospheres with radiation belts potent enough to completely erode an atmosphere of an Earth-like moon in just a few hundred million years. Strong stellar winds can also strip gas atoms from the top of an atmosphere causing them to be lost to space.

To support an Earth-like atmosphere for about 4.6 billion years (Earth's current age), a moon with a Mars-like density is estimated to need at least 7% of Earth's mass. One way to decrease loss from sputtering is for the moon to have a strong magnetic field of its own that can deflect stellar wind and radiation belts. NASA's Galileo's measurements suggest that large moons can have magnetic fields; it found Ganymede has its own magnetosphere, even though its mass is only 2.5% of Earth's. Alternatively, the moon's atmosphere may be constantly replenished by gases from subsurface sources, as thought by some scientists to be the case with Titan.

=== Tidal effects ===
While the effects of tidal acceleration are relatively modest on planets, it can be a significant source of energy for natural satellites and an alternative energy source for sustaining life.

Moons orbiting gas giants or brown dwarfs are likely to be tidally locked to their primary: that is, their days are as long as their orbits. While tidal locking may adversely affect planets within habitable zones by interfering with the distribution of stellar radiation, it may work in favour of satellite habitability by allowing tidal heating. Scientists at the NASA Ames Research Center modelled the temperature on tide-locked exoplanets in the habitability zone of red dwarf stars. They found that an atmosphere with a carbon dioxide (CO_{2}) pressure of only 1–1.5 standard atmospheres (15–22 psi) not only allows habitable temperatures, but allows liquid water on the dark side of the satellite. The temperature range of a moon that is tidally locked to a gas giant could be less extreme than with a planet locked to a star. Even though no studies have been done on the subject, modest amounts of CO_{2} are speculated to make the temperature habitable.

Tidal effects could also allow a moon to sustain plate tectonics, which would cause volcanic activity to regulate the moon's temperature and create a geodynamo effect which would give the satellite a strong magnetic field.

==== Axial tilt and climate ====
Provided gravitational interaction of a moon with other satellites can be neglected, moons tend to be tidally locked with their planets. In addition to the rotational locking mentioned above, there will also be a process termed 'tilt erosion', which has originally been coined for the tidal erosion of planetary obliquity against a planet's orbit around its host star. The final spin state of a moon then consists of a rotational period equal to its orbital period around the planet and a rotational axis that is perpendicular to the orbital plane.

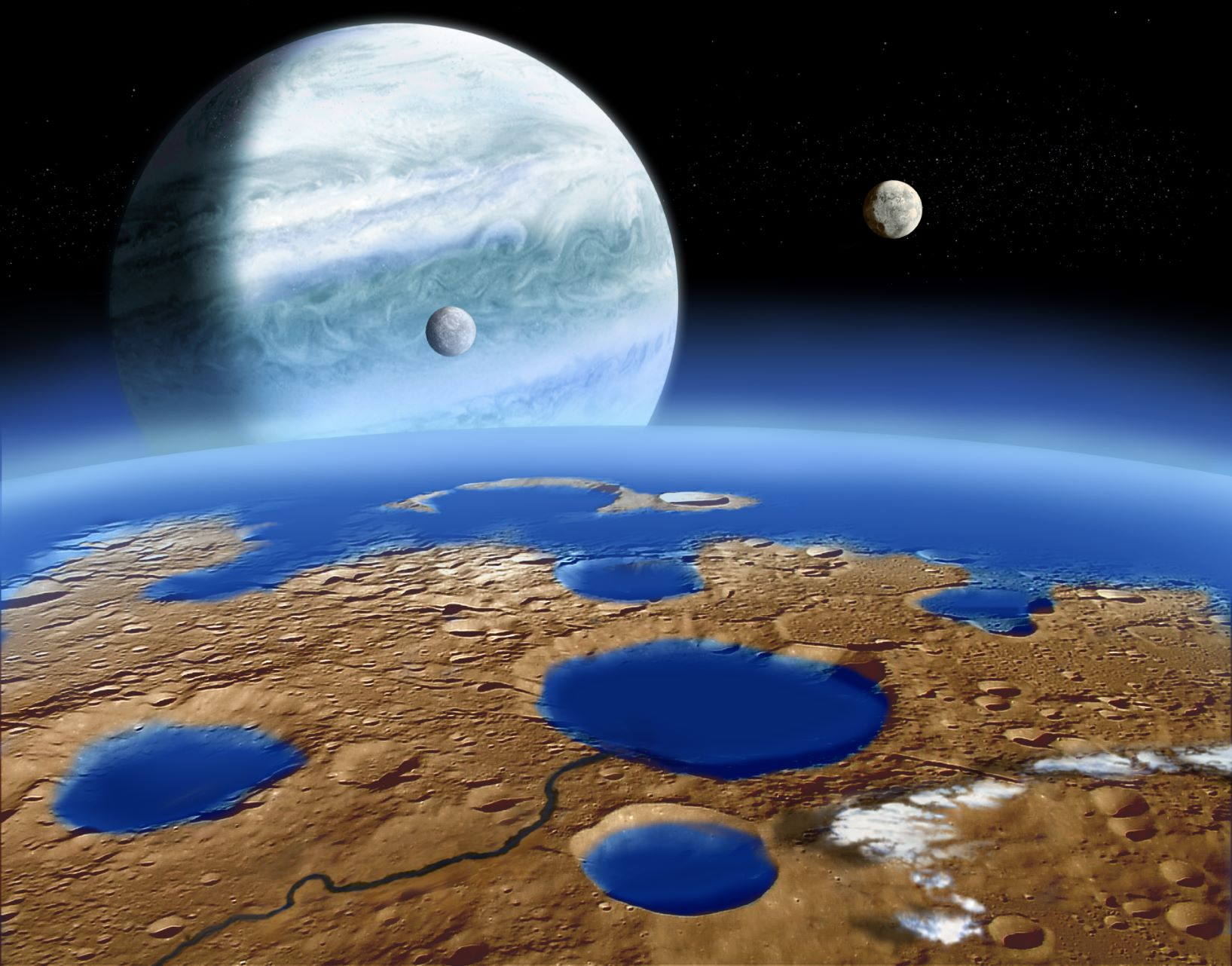
An artist rendering of an exomoon with an Earth-like atmosphere with liquid water filling its craters and water clouds. It orbits a Jupiter-like gas giant exoplanet in the habitable zone, mostly white due to water vapor clouds (Class II, in Sudarsky's exoplanet classification)

If the moon's mass is not too low compared to the planet, it may in turn stabilize the planet's axial tilt, i.e. its obliquity against the orbit around the star. On Earth, the Moon has played an important role in stabilizing the axial tilt of the Earth, thereby reducing the impact of gravitational perturbations from the other planets and ensuring only moderate climate variations throughout the planet. On Mars, however, a planet without significant tidal effects from its relatively low-mass moons Phobos and Deimos, axial tilt can undergo extreme changes from 13° to 40° on timescales of 5 to 10 million years.

Being tidally locked to a giant planet or sub-brown dwarf would allow for more moderate climates on a moon than there would be if the moon were a similar-sized planet orbiting in locked rotation in the habitable zone of the star. This is especially true of red dwarf systems, where comparatively high gravitational forces and low luminosities leave the habitable zone in an area where tidal locking would occur. If tidally locked, one rotation about the axis may take a long time relative to a planet (for example, ignoring the slight axial tilt of Earth's Moon and topographical shadowing, any given point on it has two weeks – in Earth time – of sunshine and two weeks of night in its lunar day) but these long periods of light and darkness are not as challenging for habitability as the eternal days and eternal nights on a planet tidally locked to its star.

=== Habitable edge ===
In 2012, scientists introduced a concept to define the habitable orbits of moons. The concept is similar to the circumstellar habitable zone for planets orbiting a star, but for moons orbiting a planet. This inner border, which they call the circumplanetary habitable edge, delimits the region in which a moon can be habitable around its planet. Moons closer to their planet than the habitable edge are uninhabitable.

=== Magnetosphere ===
The magnetic environment of exomoons, which is critically triggered by the intrinsic magnetic field of the host planet, has been identified as another factor of exomoon habitability. Most notably, it was found that moons at distances between about 5 and 20 planetary radii from a giant planet could be habitable from an illumination and tidal heating point of view, but still the planetary magnetosphere would critically influence their habitability.

=== Tidal-locking ===
Earth-sized exoplanets in the habitable zone around red dwarfs are often tidally locked to the host star. This has the effect that one hemisphere always faces the star, while the other remains in darkness. Like an exoplanet, an exomoon can potentially become tidally locked to its primary. However, since the exomoon's primary is an exoplanet, it would continue to rotate relative to its star after becoming tidally locked, and thus would still experience a day-night cycle indefinitely.

Scientists consider tidal heating as a threat for the habitability of exomoons.

== In the Solar System ==
The following is a list of natural satellites and environments in the Solar System with a possibility of hosting habitable environments:

Name	System	Article	Notes
Europa	Jupiter	Europa - Habitability	Thought to have a subsurface ocean maintained by geologic activity, tidal heating, and irradiation. The moon may have more water and oxygen than Earth and an oxygen exosphere.
Enceladus	Saturn	Enceladus – potential habitability	Thought to have a subsurface liquid water ocean due to tidal heating or geothermal activity. Free molecular hydrogen (H_{2}) has been detected, providing another potential energy source for life.
Mimas	Saturn	Mimas – subsurface ocean	Thought to have a subsurface liquid water ocean due to tidal heating and orbital kinetic energy, based on orbital "rocking" motion data.
Titan	Saturn	Colonization of Titan	Its atmosphere is considered similar to that of the early Earth, although somewhat thicker. The surface is characterized by hydrocarbon lakes, cryovolcanos, and methane rain and snow. Like Earth, Titan is shielded from the solar wind by a magnetosphere, in this case its parent planet for most of its orbit, but the interaction with the moon's atmosphere remains sufficient to facilitate the creation of complex organic molecules. It has a remote possibility of an exotic methane-based biochemistry.
Callisto	Jupiter	Callisto – potential habitability	Thought to have a subsurface ocean heated by tidal forces.
Ganymede	Jupiter	Ganymede – Subsurface oceans	Thought to have a magnetic field, with ice and subterranean oceans stacked up in several layers, with salty water as a second layer on top of the rocky iron core.
Io	Jupiter		Due to its proximity to Jupiter, it is subject to intense tidal heating which makes it the most volcanically active object in the Solar System. The outgassing generates a trace atmosphere.
Triton	Neptune		Its high orbital inclination with respect to Neptune's equator drives significant tidal heating, which suggests a layer of liquid water or a subsurface ocean.
Dione	Saturn		Simulations made in 2016 suggest an internal water ocean under 100 kilometres of crust possibly suitable for microbial life.
Charon	Pluto		Possible internal ocean of water and ammonia, based on suspected cryovolcanic activity.

== Extrasolar ==
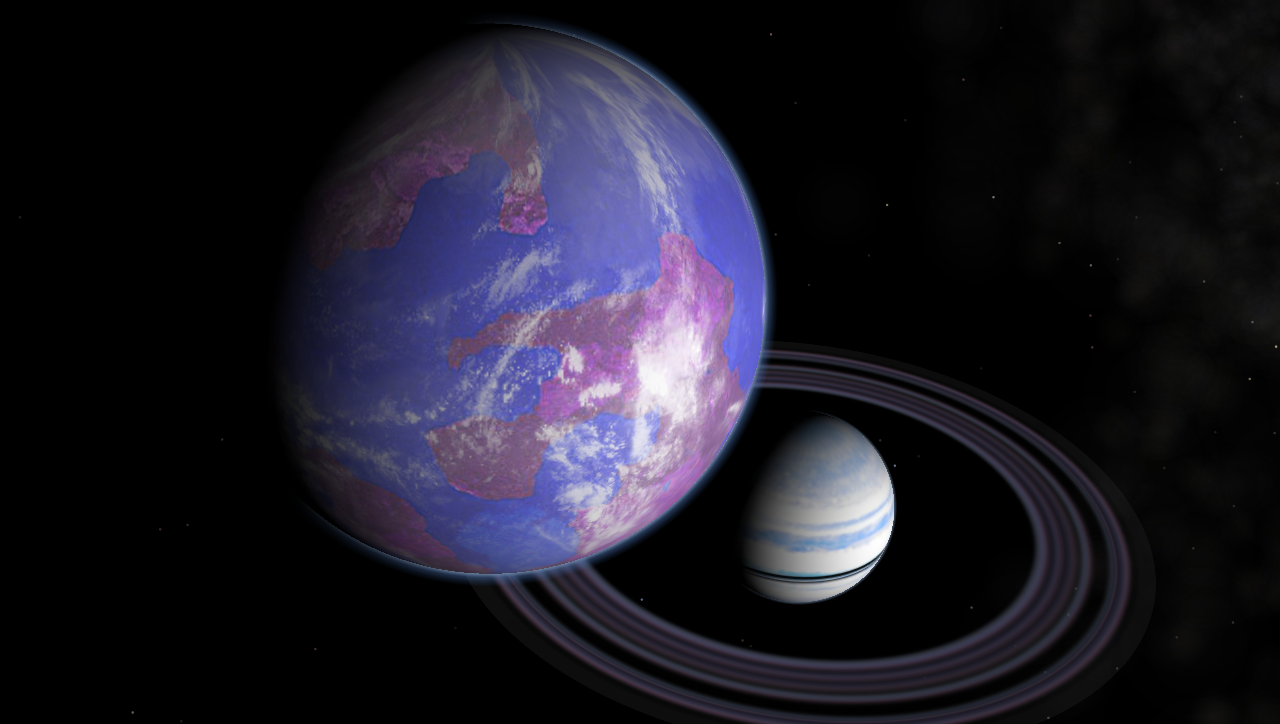
Artist's impression of a hypothetical moon around a Saturn-like exoplanet that could be habitable.

A small list of exomoon candidates has been assembled by various exoastronomy teams, but none of them have been confirmed. Given the general planet-to-satellite(s) mass ratio of 10,000, Large Saturn or Jupiter sized gas planets in the habitable zone are believed to be the best candidates to harbour Earth-like moons with more than 120 such planets by 2018. Massive exoplanets known to be located within a habitable zone (such as Gliese 876 b, 55 Cancri f, Upsilon Andromedae d, 47 Ursae Majoris b, HD 28185 b and HD 37124 c) are of particular interest as they may potentially possess natural satellites with liquid water on the surface.

Habitability of extrasolar moons will depend on stellar and planetary illumination on moons as well as the effect of eclipses on their orbit-averaged surface illumination. Beyond that, tidal heating might play a role for a moon's habitability. In 2012, scientists introduced a concept to define the habitable orbits of moons; they define an inner border of an habitable moon around a certain planet and call it the circumplanetary "habitable edge". Moons closer to their planet than the habitable edge are uninhabitable. When effects of eclipses as well as constraints from a satellite's orbital stability are used to model the runaway greenhouse limit of hypothetical moons, it is estimated that — depending on a moon's orbital eccentricity — there is a minimum mass of roughly 0.20 solar masses for stars to host habitable moons within the stellar habitable zone. The magnetic environment of exomoons, which is critically triggered by the intrinsic magnetic field of the host planet, has been identified as another factor of exomoon habitability. Most notably, it was found that moons at distances between about 5 and 20 planetary radii from a giant planet could be habitable from an illumination and tidal heating point of view, but still the planetary magnetosphere would critically influence their habitability.

== In popular culture ==
Natural satellites that host life are common in (science-fictional) written works, films, television shows, video games, and other popular media.

- factual satellite, fictional life
  - Europa, Callisto, Ganymede, Io and Titan in "Cowboy Bebop" (1998)
  - The Moon in A Trip to the Moon (1903) and many other films
  - Europa in Europa Report (2013) and Watchmen (2019)
  - Titan in Marvel Comics
- fictional satellite
  - Andoria from the Star Trek franchise
  - Yavin 4 from Star Wars (1977)
  - Endor in Return of the Jedi (1983)
  - LV-426 in Alien (1979) and Aliens (1986)
  - LV-223 in Prometheus (2012) and Predators (2010)
  - Pandora from the Avatar franchise
  - K23 in The Midnight Sky (2020)
  - The homeworld of the Stranger's inhabitants in the DLC for the video game Outer Wilds
  - Laythe in the video game Kerbal Space Program and its sequel
  - Eayn, the Kig-Yar homeworld, orbits Chu'ot, the third planet in the Y'Deio system, which is located 41 light years from the Sol system in the lore of Halo.
  - Harval, the Angara homeworld, orbits the gas giant Faroang, in Mass Effect: Andromeda; it is also the namesake of their home system.
  - Haven, the earth-like satellite of the gas giant Cat's Eye, is the setting on many stories and novels in Jerry Pournelle's CoDominium future history.
  - Talos-II, the earth-like satellite of the gas giant Talos, is the setting in Arknights: Endfield

== See also ==
- Earth analog
- Habitability of other celestial body types
  - K-type main-sequence star systems
  - neutron star systems
  - red dwarf systems
  - yellow dwarf systems
- Kepler-1625b I, possible exomoon of exoplanet Kepler-1625b
- Lunar habitation, referring to the hypothetical event of Earth-evolved life travelling to the Moon to live there
