= Habitability of G-type main-sequence star systems =

Likelihood of finding extraterrestrial life in yellow dwarf systems

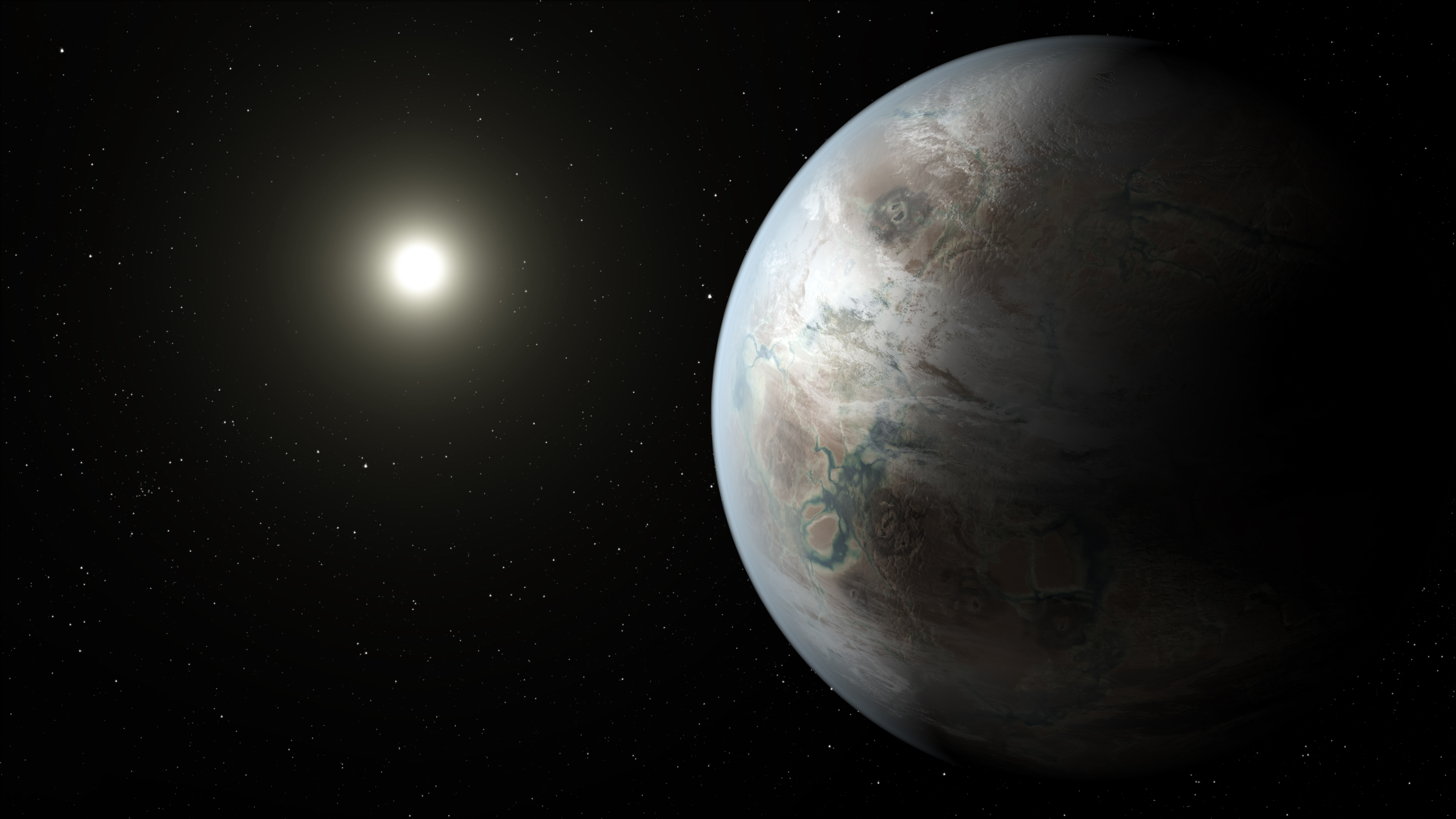
Artistic interpretation of Kepler-452b, a potentially habitable exoplanet belonging to a yellow dwarf

Habitability of yellow dwarf systems defines the suitability for life of exoplanets belonging to yellow dwarf stars. These systems are the object of study among the scientific community because they are considered the most suitable for harboring living organisms, together with those belonging to K-type stars.

Yellow dwarfs comprise the G-type stars of the main sequence, with masses between 0.9 and 1.1 M☉ and surface temperatures between 5000 and 6000 K, like the Sun. They are the third most common in the Milky Way Galaxy and the only ones in which the habitable zone coincides completely with the ultraviolet habitable zone.

Since the habitable zone is farther away in more massive and luminous stars, the separation between the main star and the inner edge of this region is greater in yellow dwarfs than in red and orange dwarfs. Therefore, planets located in this zone of G-type stars are safe from the intense stellar emissions that occur after their formation and are not as affected by the gravitational influence of their star as those belonging to smaller stellar bodies. Thus, all planets in the habitable zone of such stars exceed the tidal locking limit and their rotation is therefore not synchronized with their orbit.

The Earth, orbiting a yellow dwarf, represents the only known example of planetary habitability. For this reason, the main goal in the field of exoplanetology is to find an Earth analog planet that meets its main characteristics, such as size, average temperature and location around a star similar to the Sun. However, technological limitations make it difficult to find these objects due to either the infrequency of their transits or their small radial-velocity semi-amplitudes, both are consequences of the distance that separates them from their stars or semi-major axis.

== Characteristics ==
Yellow dwarf stars correspond to the G-class stars of the main sequence, with a mass between 0.9 and 1.1 M☉, and surface temperatures between 5000 and 6000 K. Since the Sun itself is a yellow dwarf, of type G2V, these types of stars are also known as solar analogs. They rank third among the most common main sequence stars, after red and orange dwarfs, with a representativeness of 10% of the total Milky Way. They remain in the main sequence for approximately 10 billion years. After the Sun, the closest G-type star to the Earth is Alpha Centauri A, 4.4 light-years away and belonging to a multiple star system.

All stars go through a phase of intense activity after their formation due to their rotation, which is much faster at the beginning of their lives. The duration of this period varies according to the mass of the object: the least massive stars can remain in this state for up to 3 billion years, compared to 500 million for G-type stars. Studies by the team of Edward Guinan, an astrophysicist at Villanova University, reveal that the Sun rotated ten times faster in its early days. Since the rotation speed of a star affects its magnetic field, the Sun's X-ray and UV emissions were hundreds of times more intense than they are today.

The extension of this phase in red dwarfs, as well as the probable tidal locking of their potentially habitable planets with respect to them, could wipe out the magnetic field of these planets, resulting in the loss of almost all their atmosphere and water to space by interaction with the stellar wind. In contrast, the semi-major axis of planetary objects belonging to the habitable zone of G-type stars is wide enough to allow planetary rotation. In addition, the duration of the period of intense stellar activity is too short to eliminate a significant part of the atmosphere on planets with masses similar to or greater than that of the Earth, which have a gravity and magnetosphere capable of counteracting the effects of stellar winds.

== Habitable area ==
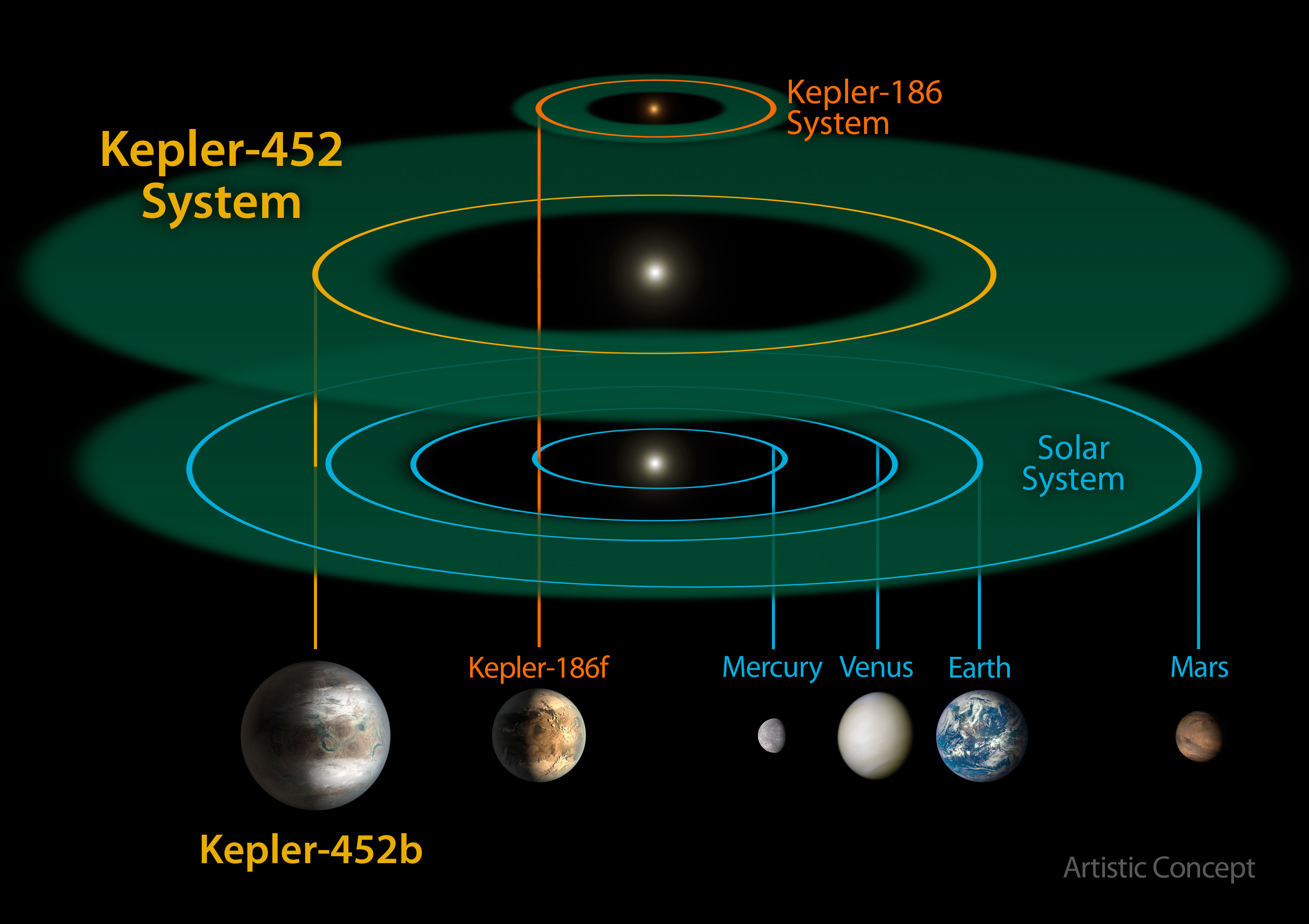
Habitable zone of the stars Kepler-186 (red dwarf), Kepler-452 and the Sun (both yellow dwarfs)

The habitable zone around yellow dwarfs varies according to their size and luminosity, although the inner boundary is usually at 0.84 AU and the outer one at 1.67 in a G2V class dwarf like the Sun. For a G5V class star with a radius of 0.95 R☉—smaller than the Sun—the habitable zone would correspond to the region located between 0.8 and 1.58 AU with respect to the star. For a G0V star—larger than the Sun—it would be located at a distance of between 1 and 2 AU from the stellar body. In orbits smaller than the inner boundary of the habitable zone, a process of water evaporation, hydrogen separation by photolysis and loss of hydrogen to space by hydrodynamic escape would be triggered. Beyond the outer limit of the habitable zone, temperatures would be low enough to allow CO_{2} condensation, which would lead to an increase in albedo and a feedback reduction of the greenhouse effect until permanent global glaciation would occur.

The size of the habitable zone is directly proportional to the mass and luminosity of its star, so the larger the star, the larger the habitable zone and the farther from its surface. Red dwarfs, the smallest of the main sequence, have a very small habitable zone close to them, which subjects any potentially habitable planets in the system to the effects of their star, including probable tidal locking. Even in a small yellow dwarf like Tau Ceti, of type G8.5V, the locking limit is at 0.4237 AU versus the 0.522 AU that marks the inner boundary of the habitable zone, so any planetary object orbiting a G-class star in this region will far exceed the locking limit, and will have day-night cycles like Earth.

In yellow dwarfs, this region coincides entirely with the ultraviolet habitability zone. This area is determined by an inner limit beyond which exposure to ultraviolet radiation would be too high for DNA and by an outer limit that provides the minimum levels for living things to carry out their biogenic processes. In the Solar System, this region is located between 0.71 and 1.9 AU with respect to the Sun, compared to the 0.84–1.67 AU that mark the extremes of the habitable zone.

== Life potential ==
Given the length of the main sequence in G-type stars, the levels of ultraviolet radiation in their habitable zone, the semi-major axis of the inner boundary of this region and the distance to their tidal locking limit, among other factors, yellow dwarfs are considered to be the most hospitable to life next to K-type stars.

One goal in exoplanetary research is to find an object that has the main characteristics of our planet, such as radius, mass, temperature, atmospheric composition and belonging to a star similar to the Sun. In theory, these Earth analogs should have comparable habitability conditions that would allow the proliferation of extraterrestrial life.

Based on the serious problems for planetary habitability presented by red dwarf systems and stellar bodies of type F or higher, the only stars that might offer a bearable scenario for life would be those of type K and G. Solar analogs used to be considered as the most likely candidates to host a solar-like planetary system, and as the best positioned to support carbon-based life forms and liquid water oceans. Subsequent studies, such as "Superhabitable Worlds" by René Heller and John Armstrong, establish that orange dwarfs may be more suitable for life than G-type dwarfs, and host hypothetical superhabitable planets.

However, yellow dwarfs still represent the only stellar type for which there is evidence of their suitability for life. Moreover, while in other types of stars the habitable zone does not coincide entirely with the ultraviolet habitable zone, in G-class stars the habitable zone lies entirely within the limits of the latter. Finally, yellow dwarfs have a much shorter initial phase of intense stellar activity than K-type and M-type stars, which allows planets belonging to solar analogs to preserve their primordial atmospheres more easily and to maintain them for much of the main sequence.

== Discoveries ==
Most of the exoplanets discovered have been detected by the Kepler space telescope, which uses the transit method to find planets around other systems. This procedure analyzes the brightness of stars to detect dips that indicate the passage of a planetary object in front of them from the perspective of the observatory. It is the method that has been most successful in exoplanetary research, together with the radial velocity method, which consists of analyzing the vibrations caused in the stars by the gravitational effects of the planets orbiting them. The use of these procedures with the limitations of current telescopes makes it difficult to find objects with orbits similar to the Earth's orbits or higher, which generates a bias in favor of planets with a short semi-major axis. As a consequence, most of the exoplanets detected are either excessively hot or belong to low-mass stars, whose habitable zone is close to them and any object orbiting in this region will have a significantly shorter year than the Earth.

Planetary bodies belonging to the habitable zone of yellow dwarfs, such as Kepler-22b, 82 G. Eridani d or Earth, take hundreds of days to complete an orbit around their star. The higher luminosity of these stars, the scarcity of transits and the semi-major axis of their planets located in the habitable zone reduce the probabilities of detecting this class of objects and considerably increase the number of false positives, as in the cases of KOI-5123.01 and KOI-5927.01. The ground-based and orbital observatories projected for the next ten years may increase the discoveries of Earth analogs in yellow dwarf systems.

=== Kepler-452b ===
Kepler-452b lies 1400 light-years from Earth, in the constellation Cygnus. Its radius of about 1.6 R_{⊕} places it right on the boundary separating telluric planets from mini-Neptunes established by the team of Courtney Dressing, a researcher at the Harvard-Smithsonian Center for Astrophysics (CfA). If the planet's density is similar to Earth's, its mass will be about 5 M_{⊕} and its gravity twice as great. A G2V-type yellow dwarf like the Sun belongs to Kepler-452, with an estimated age of 6 billion years (6 Ga) versus the solar system's 4.5 Ga.

The mass of its star is slightly higher than that of the Sun, 1.04 M_{☉}, so despite the fact that it completes an orbit around it every 385 days versus 365 terrestrial days, it is warmer than the Earth. If it has similar albedo and atmospheric composition, the average surface temperature will be around 29 °C.

According to Jon Jenkins of NASA's Ames Research Center, it is not known whether Kepler-452b is a terrestrial planet, an ocean world or a mini-Neptune. If it is an Earth-like telluric object, it is likely to have a higher concentration of clouds, intense volcanic activity, and is about to suffer an uncontrolled greenhouse effect similar to that of Venus due to the constant increase in the luminosity of its star, after having remained throughout the main sequence in its habitable zone. Doug Caldwell, a SETI Institute scientist and member of the Kepler mission, estimates that Kepler-452b may be undergoing the same process that the Earth will undergo in a billion years.

=== Tau Ceti e ===
Tau Ceti e orbits a G8.5V-type star in the constellation Cetus, 12 light-years from Earth. It has a radius of 1.59 R_{⊕} and a mass of 4.29 M_{⊕}, so like Kepler-452b it lies at the separation boundary between terrestrial and gaseous planets. With an orbital period of only 168 days, its temperature assuming an Earth-like atmospheric composition and albedo would be about 50 °C.

The planet is located just at the inner edge of the habitable zone and receives about 60% more light than Earth. Its size may also imply a higher concentration of gases in its atmosphere, making it a super-Venus type object. Otherwise, it could be the first thermoplanet discovered.

=== Kepler-22b ===
Kepler-22b is at a distance of 600 light-years, in the constellation Cygnus. It completes one orbit around its G5V-type star every 290 days. Its radius is 2.35 R_{⊕} and its estimated mass, for an Earth-like density, would be 20.36 M_{⊕}. If the planet's atmosphere and albedo were similar to Earth's, its surface temperature would be around 22 °C.

It was the first exoplanet found by the Kepler telescope belonging to the habitability zone of its star. Because of its size, considering the limit established by Courtney Dressing's team, its probability to be a mini-Neptune is very high.

=== 82 G. Eridani d ===
In October 2024, the existence of a temperate 6.4-Earth mass planet orbiting the G-type star HD 20794 (at 19.7 light-years away) was confirmed. This planet orbits partially exterior to the circumstellar habitable zone.

== See also ==
- Astrobiology
- Habitable zone
- Earth analog
- Superhabitable world
- Habitability of natural satellites
- Habitability of red dwarf systems
- Habitability of K-type main-sequence star systems
- Habitability of F-type main-sequence star systems
- List of potentially habitable exoplanets

== Bibliography ==
- Heller, René; Armstrong, John (2014). "Superhabitable Worlds". Astrobiology. 14 (1): 50–66. arXiv:1401.2392. Bibcode:2014AsBio..14...50H. doi:10.1089/ast.2013.1088. PMID 24380533. S2CID 1824897.
- Kasting, James F.; Whitmire, Daniel P.; Reynolds, Ray T. (1993). "Habitable Zones around main Sequence Stars". Icarus. 1 (101): 101–128. Bibcode:1993Icar..101..108K. doi:10.1006/icar.1993.1010. PMID 11536936.
- Perryman, Michael (2011). The Exoplanet Handbook. Cambridge University Press. ISBN 978-0-521-76559-6.
- Ulmschneider, Peter (2006). Intelligent Life in the Universe: Principles and Requirements Behind Its Emergence (Advances in Astrobiology and Biogeophysics). Springer. ISBN 978-3540328360.
