= Habitability of red dwarf systems =

Possible factors for life around red dwarf stars

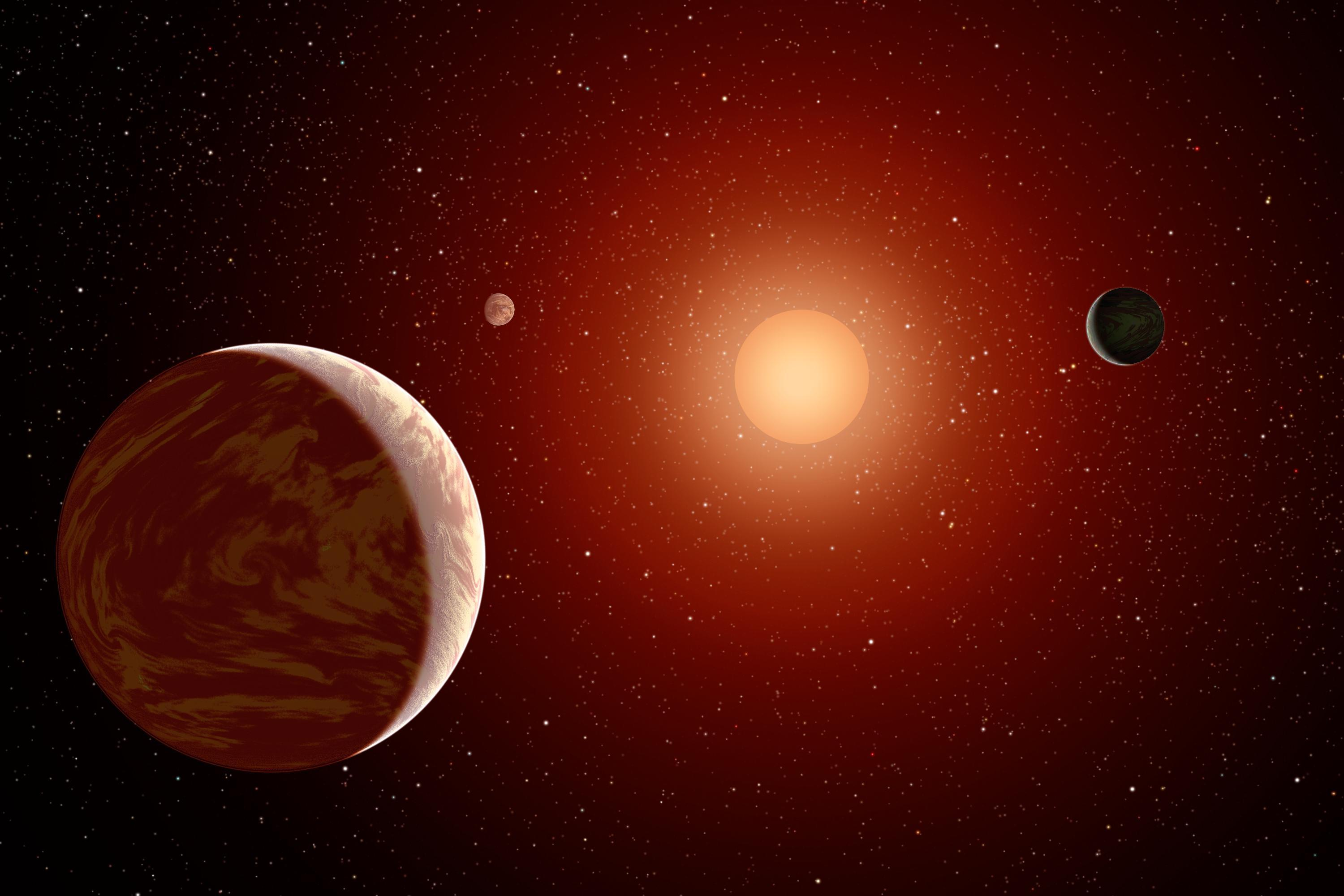
An artist's impression of a young red dwarf surrounded by three planets

The theorized habitability of red dwarf systems is determined by factors including tidal effects, flaring, and variability. Modern evidence suggests that planets in red dwarf systems are unlikely to be habitable, due to high probability of tidal locking, likely lack of atmospheres, and the high stellar variation many such planets would experience. However, many recent models have proposed mechanisms through which red dwarfs can mitigate these effects. Research suggests that magnetic fields can shield planets from solar flares and theoretical simulations have shown the possibility of atmospheric mechanisms that can redistribute heat from the dayside to the nightside. The sheer number and longevity of red dwarfs also provides ample opportunity to realize any small possibility of habitability.

As of 2025, arguments concerning the habitability of red dwarf systems are unresolved, and the area remains an open question of study in the fields of climate modeling and the evolution of life on Earth. Observational data and statistical arguments suggest that red dwarf systems are uninhabitable for indeterminate reasons. In contrast, 3D climate models favor habitability and wider habitable zones for slow rotating and tidally locked planets. Investigating the habitability of red dwarf star systems could help determine the frequency of life in the universe and aid scientific understanding of the evolution of life.

== Background ==
Red dwarfs are the smallest, coolest, and most common type of star. Estimates of their abundance range from 70% of stars in spiral galaxies to more than 90% of all stars in elliptical galaxies, an often quoted median figure being 72–76% of the stars in the Milky Way (known since the 1990s from radio telescopic observation to be a barred spiral). Red dwarfs are usually defined as being of spectral type M, although some definitions are wider (including also some or all K-type stars). Given their low energy output, red dwarfs are almost never naked-eye visible from Earth.

This low luminosity causes the habitable zone of red dwarf systems to occur closer to the star. This helps in the detection of Earth-like exoplanets through the transit method, as the probability of an observable transit is 1.5–2.7%, much greater than the Earth-Sun system's 0.47%. Detection is also not likely to be affected by stellar activity.

== Longevity and ubiquity ==
Red dwarfs' greatest advantage as candidate stars for life is their longevity. It took 4.5 billion years for intelligent life to evolve on Earth, and life as we know it will see suitable conditions for 1 to 2.3 billion years more. Red dwarfs, by contrast, could live for trillions of years, as their nuclear reactions are far slower than those of larger stars. (Note: The more massive a star is, the shorter it lives.) Estimates suggest that 10–75% of dwarfs have Earth or super-Earth sized planets. Combined with their longevity, this leaves potential for the evolution of microbial or intelligent life in the future.

== Luminosity and spectral composition ==
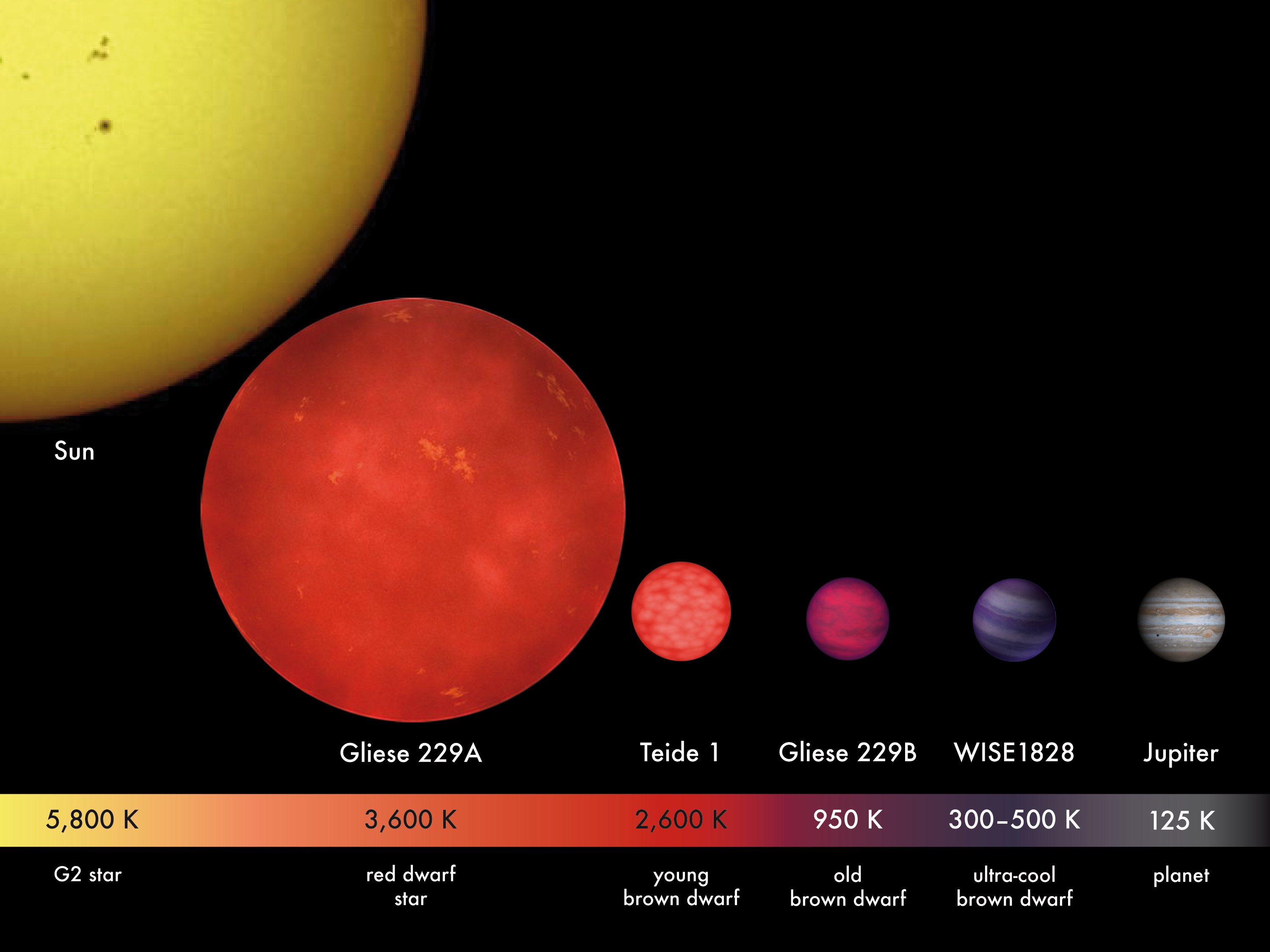
Relative star sizes and photospheric temperatures. Any planet around a red dwarf, such as the one shown here (Gliese 229A), would have to orbit closely to achieve Earth-like temperatures, probably inducing tidal lock. See Aurelia. Credit: MPIA/V. Joergens.

For years, astronomers have been pessimistic about red dwarfs as potential candidates for hosting life. The low masses of red dwarfs (from roughly 0.08 to 0.60 solar masses (M_{☉})) cause their nuclear fusion reactions to proceed exceedingly slowly, giving them low luminosities ranging from 10% to just 0.0125% that of the Earth's Sun. Consequently, any planet orbiting a red dwarf would need a low semi-major axis to maintain an Earth-like surface temperature, from 0.268 astronomical units (AU) for a relatively luminous red dwarf like Lacaille 8760 to 0.032 AU for a smaller star like Proxima Centauri. Such a world would have a year lasting just 3 to 150 Earth days.

Photosynthesis on such a planet would be difficult, as much of the low luminosity falls under the lower energy infrared and red part of the electromagnetic spectrum, and would therefore require additional photons to achieve excitation potentials. Potential plants would likely adapt to a much wider spectrum (and as such appear black in visible light). However, further research, including a consideration of the amount of photosynthetically active radiation, has suggested that tidally locked planets in red dwarf systems might at least be habitable for higher plants. Further, some bacteria, such as purple bacteria, have pigments such as bacteriochlorophyll which absorb infrared light, making at least hotter red dwarfs potentially suitable for photosynthetic life.

In addition, because water strongly absorbs red and infrared light, less energy would be available for aquatic life on red dwarf planets. However, a similar effect of preferential absorption by water ice would increase its temperature relative to an equivalent amount of radiation from a Sun-like star, thereby extending the habitable zone of red dwarfs outward.

The evolution of the red dwarf stars may also inhibit habitability. As red dwarf stars have an extended pre-main sequence phase, their eventual habitable zones would be for around 1 billion years in a zone where water was not liquid but rather in a gaseous state. Thus, terrestrial planets in the actual habitable zones, if provided with abundant surface water in their formation, would have been subject to a runaway greenhouse effect for several hundred million years. During such an early runaway greenhouse phase, photolysis of water vapor would allow hydrogen escape to space and the loss of several Earth oceans of water, leaving a thick abiotic oxygen atmosphere. Nevertheless, photolysis could be at least slowed down with a sufficient ozone layer.

Since the lifespan of red dwarf stars exceeds the age of the known universe, the further evolution of red dwarfs is known only by theory and simulations. According to computer simulations, a red dwarf becomes a blue dwarf after exhausting its hydrogen supply. As this kind of star is more luminous than the prior red dwarf, planets orbiting it that were frozen during the former stage could be thawed during the several billions of years this evolutionary stage lasts (5 billion years, for example, for a 0.16 M_{☉} star), giving life an opportunity to arise and evolve.

== Tidal effects ==
The effect of tidal locking on red dwarf habitability is still debated. In order for red dwarf exoplanets to retain significant amounts of water in the habitable zone, they must orbit close to the star, and are likely tidally locked. Tidal locking makes the planet rotate on its axis once every revolution around the star, meaning one side of the planet would eternally face the star and another side would perpetually face away, creating great extremes of temperature.

How fast tidal locking occurs can depend on a planet's oceans and atmosphere. This may cause tidal locking to fail to occur even after many billions of years. Further, tidal locking is not the only possible end state of tidal dampening. Mercury, for example, has had sufficient time to tidally lock, but is in a 3:2 spin orbit resonance due to an eccentric orbit. Depending on the ratio, resonance can create preferentially heated regions on the planet, causing similar issues to habitability as tidal locking.

For many years, it was believed that life on such planets would be limited to a ring-like region known as the terminator, where the star would always appear on or close to the horizon. It was also believed that efficient heat transfer between the sides of the planet necessitated atmospheric circulation of an atmosphere so thick as to disallow photosynthesis. Due to differential heating, it was argued, a tidally locked planet would experience fierce winds with permanent torrential rain at the point directly facing the local star, the sub-solar point.

1997 studies by NASA's Ames Research Center have shown that a planet's atmosphere (assuming it included greenhouse gases CO_{2} and H_{2}O) need only be 100 millibar, or 10% of Earth's atmosphere, for the star's heat to be effectively carried to the night side, a figure well within the bounds of photosynthesis. Subsequent research has shown that seawater, too, could effectively circulate without freezing solid if the ocean basins were deep enough to allow free flow beneath the night side's ice cap. A 2010 study concluded that Earth-like water worlds tidally locked to their stars would still have temperatures above 240 K (−33 °C) on the night side. Climate models constructed in 2013 indicate that cloud formation on tidally locked planets would minimize the temperature difference between the day and the night side, greatly improving habitability prospects for red dwarf planets.

A 2020 model also suggested that mineral dust in the atmosphere can help mitigate the extreme temperatures on tidally locked planets. As water evaporates, less of the surface is covered in water, and the amount of mineral dust suspended in the atmosphere increases. This helps cool down the entire planet and increase the amount of water retained in the atmosphere. The proposed mineral dust would obscure detection of prominent biomarker gases such as methane and ozone, and could impact assessment of red dwarf habitability.

=== Tidal Venuses ===
Tidal heating experienced by planets in the habitable zone of red dwarfs less than 30% of the mass of the Sun may cause them to be "baked out" and become "tidal Venuses." The eccentricity of over 150 planets found orbiting M dwarfs was measured, and it was found that two-thirds of these exoplanets are exposed to extreme tidal forces, rendering them uninhabitable due to the intense heat generated by tidal heating.

There may be too little water for habitable planets around many red dwarfs; what little water is on such planets, especially Earth-sized ones, may be located on the cold night side of the planet. In contrast to the predictions of earlier studies on tidal Venuses, though, this "trapped water" may help to stave off runaway greenhouse effects and improve the habitability of red dwarf systems.

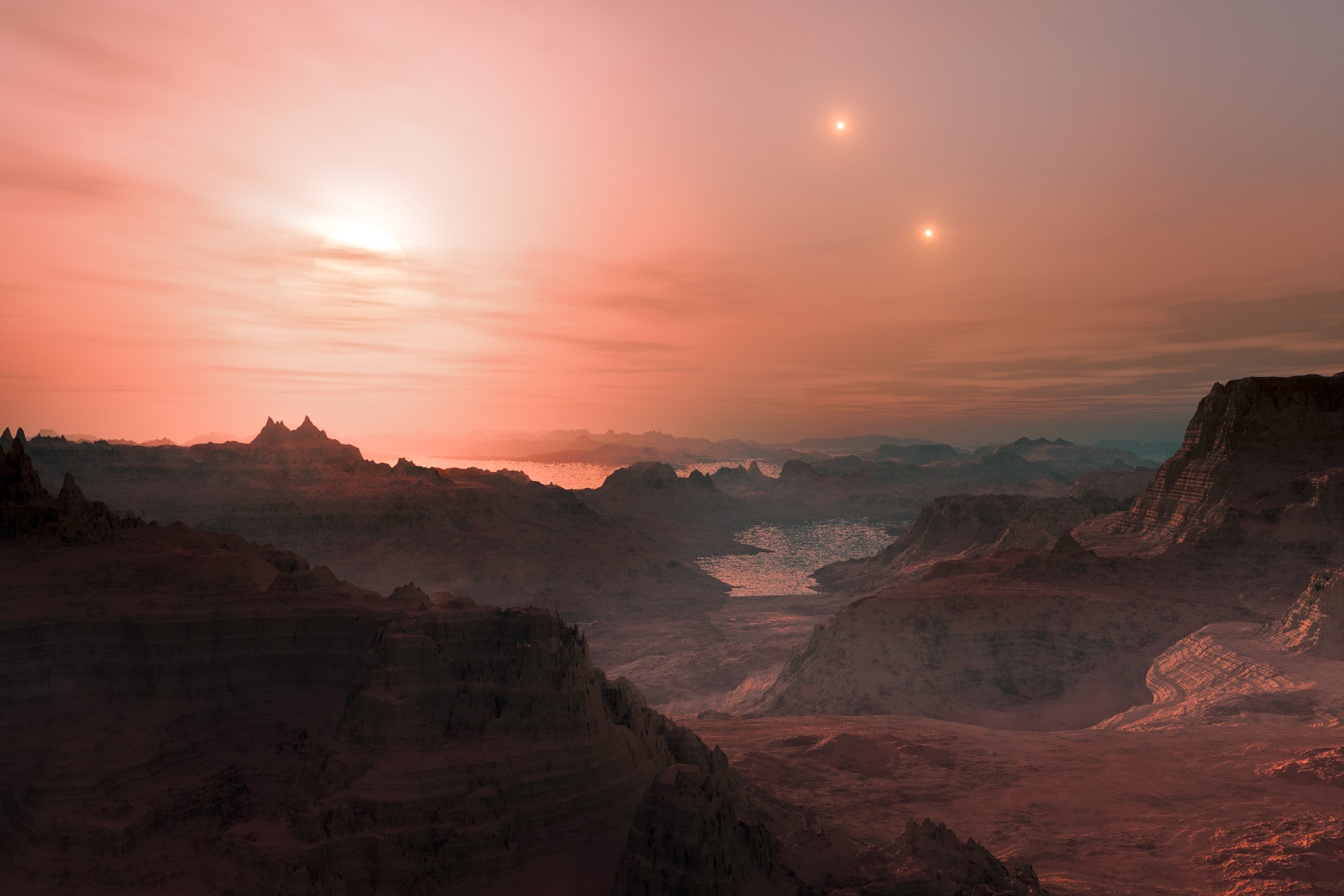
Artist's impression of GJ 667 Cc, a potentially habitable planet orbiting a red dwarf constituent in a trinary star system

== Variability ==
Red dwarfs are far more volatile than their larger, more stable cousins. Often, they are covered in starspots that can dim their emitted light by up to 40% for months at a time. At other times, red dwarfs emit gigantic flares that can double their brightness in a matter of minutes. Indeed, as more and more red dwarfs have been scrutinized for variability, more of them have been classified as flare stars to some degree or other. Such variation in brightness could be very damaging for life. Recent 3D climate models simulate flare events by altering the stellar flux received by any given planet. One study found that, should a tidally locked planet possess a sufficient atmosphere, cloud coverage and albedo increase monotonically with stellar flux, increasing the resilience of the planet to variations in radiation. This caveat has proven difficult, however, since flares produce torrents of charged particles that could strip off sizable portions of the planet's atmosphere.

== Solar flaring and atmospheres ==
For a planet around a red dwarf star to support life, it would require a rapidly rotating magnetic field to protect it from the flares. A tidally locked planet rotates slowly, and so may not be able to produce a geodynamo at its core. The violent flaring period of a red dwarf's life cycle is estimated to last for only about the first 1.2 billion years of its active life. If a planet forms far away from a red dwarf so as to avoid atmospheric erosion, and then migrates into the star's habitable zone after this turbulent initial period, it is possible for life to develop. However, observations of the 7 to 12-billion year old Barnard's Star showcase that even old red dwarfs can have significant flare activity. Barnard's Star was long assumed to have little activity, but in 1998, astronomers observed an intense stellar flare, showing that it is a flare star.

The largest flares occur at high latitudes near the stellar poles; if an exoplanet's orbit is aligned with the stellar rotation (as is the case with the planets of the Solar System), then it is less affected by the flares than formerly thought.

Scientists who believe in the Rare Earth hypothesis doubt that red dwarfs could support life amid strong flaring. Tidal locking would probably result in a relatively low planetary magnetic moment. Active red dwarfs that emit coronal mass ejections (CMEs) would bow back the magnetosphere until it contacted the planetary atmosphere. As a result, the atmosphere would undergo strong erosion, possibly leaving the planet uninhabitable. However, it was found that red dwarfs have a much lower CME rate than expected from their rotation or flare activity, and large CMEs occur rarely. This suggests that atmospheric erosion is caused mainly by radiation rather than CMEs.

Otherwise, it is suggested that if the planet had a magnetic field, it would deflect the particles from the atmosphere (even the slow rotation of a tidally locked M-dwarf planet—it spins once for every time it orbits its star—would be enough to generate a magnetic field as long as part of the planet's interior remained molten). This magnetic field must be much stronger than Earth's to protect against flares of the observed magnitude: 10–1000 G versus Earth's ~0.5 G. This is unlikely to be generated. Mathematical models further conclude that, even under the highest attainable dynamo-generated magnetic field strengths, exoplanets with masses similar to that of Earth lose a significant fraction of their atmospheres by the erosion of the exobase's atmosphere by Coronal mass ejection (CME) bursts and extreme ultraviolet (XUV) emissions (even those Earth-like planets closer than 0.8 AU, affecting also G and K stars, are prone to losing their atmospheres). Atmospheric erosion could likely trigger depletion of water oceans also. Planets shrouded by a thick haze of hydrocarbons, such as the ones on primordial Earth or Saturn's moon Titan might still survive the flares, as floating hydrocarbon droplets are particularly efficient at absorbing ultraviolet radiation.

Measurements reject the presence of relevant atmospheres in two exoplanets orbiting a red dwarf: TRAPPIST-1b and TRAPPIST-1c. The two planets are bare rocks, or have very thin atmospheres. The rest of the TRAPPIST-1 planets, all of whom other than the exceptions of TRAPPIST-1h or possibly TRAPPIST-1d are in the habitable zone, are unlikely to have atmospheres, but their existence is not entirely ruled out. Other potentially habitable planets orbiting red dwarfs, such as LHS 1140b or K2-18b have likely atmospheres. Calculations based in XUV fluences provide that five out of 49 planets below 1.8 Earth-radii orbiting red dwarfs within 50 parsecs would have retained an atmosphere.

Data obtained from the MIRI (Mid-Infrared Instrument) of the James Webb Space Telescope reveal that temperate rocky exoplanets orbiting Red-dwarfs would be airless worlds (TRAPPIST-1 b, TRAPPIST-1 c, LHS 1140 c, TOI 1468 b, GJ 3929 b, GJ 486 b, GJ 1132 b, LTT 1445A b), being inconclusive the data for LHS 1478 b.

Another way that life could initially protect itself from radiation would be remaining underwater until the star had passed through its early flare stage, assuming the planet could retain enough of an atmosphere to sustain liquid oceans. Once life reached land, the low amount of UV produced by a quiet red dwarf means that life could thrive without an ozone layer, and thus never need to produce oxygen.

== Methane habitable zone ==
If methane-based life is possible (similar to hypothetical life on Titan), there would be a second habitable zone further out from the star corresponding to the region where methane is liquid. Titan's atmosphere is transparent to red and infrared light, so more of the light from red dwarfs would be expected to reach the surface of a Titan-like planet. This zone would lie at 2.573 astronomical units (AU) for Lacaille 8760, to 0.379 AU for Proxima Centauri.

== Frequency of Earth-sized worlds around ultra-cool dwarfs ==
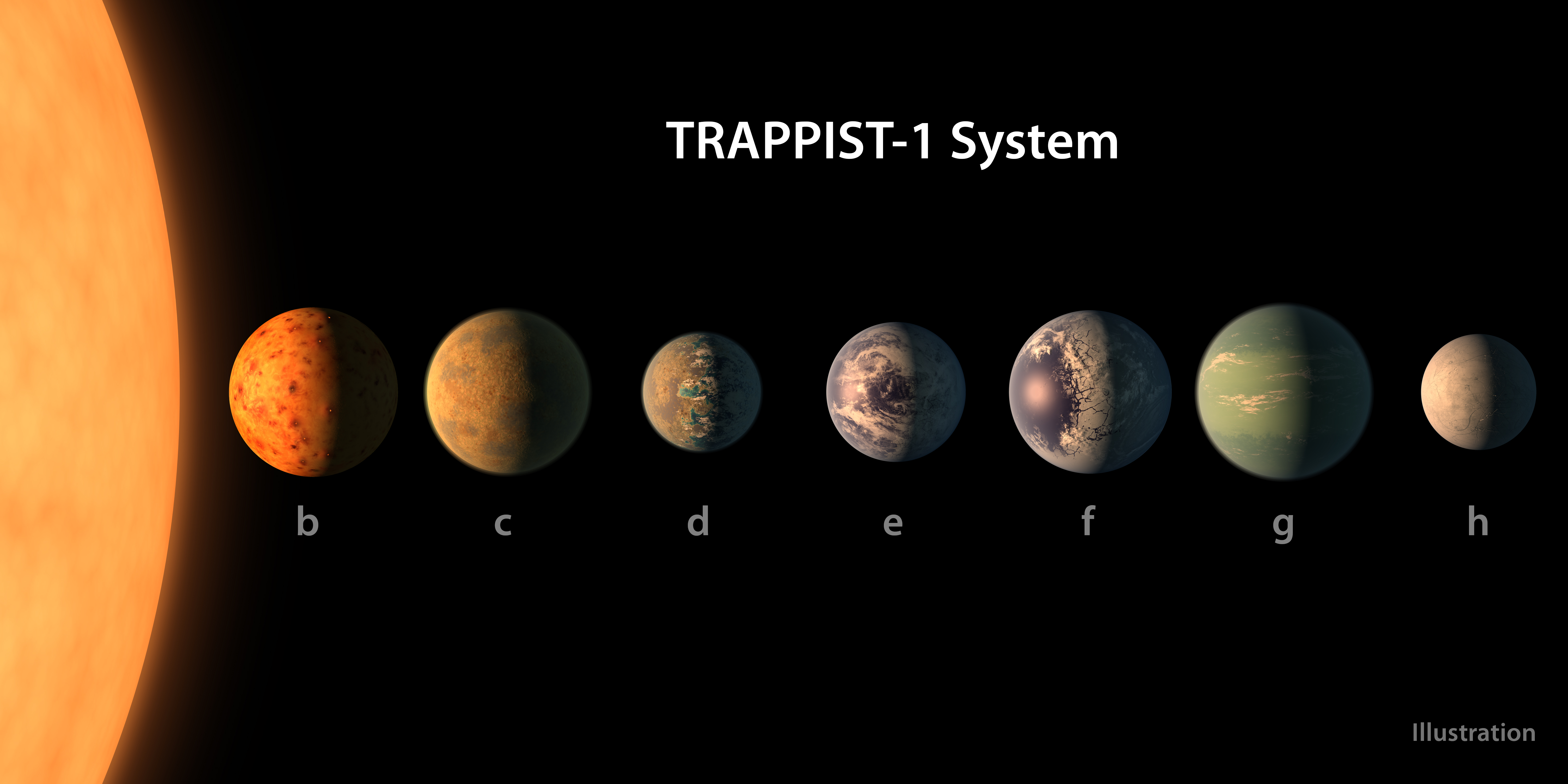
TRAPPIST-1 planetary system (artist's impression)

A study of archival Spitzer data gives the first idea and estimate of how frequent Earth-sized worlds are around ultra-cool dwarf stars: 30–45%. A computer simulation finds that planets that form around stars with similar mass to TRAPPIST-1 (c. 0.084 M_{⊙}) most likely have sizes similar to the Earth's.

== In fiction ==
- Ark: In Stephen Baxter's Ark, after Earth is completely submerged by the oceans a small group of humans embark on an interstellar journey eventually making it to a planet named Earth III. The planet is cold, tidally locked and the plant life is black (to better absorb light from a red dwarf).
- Draco Tavern: In Larry Niven's Draco Tavern stories, the highly advanced Chirpsithra aliens evolved on a tide-locked oxygen world around a red dwarf. However, no detail is given beyond that it was about 1 terrestrial mass, a little colder, and used red dwarf sunlight.
- Nemesis: Isaac Asimov avoids the tidal effect issues of the red dwarf Nemesis by making the habitable "planet" a satellite of a gas giant which is tidally locked to the star.
- Star Maker: In Olaf Stapledon's 1937 science fiction novel Star Maker, one of the many alien civilizations in the Milky Way he describes is located in the terminator zone of a tidally locked planet of a red dwarf system. This planet is inhabited by intelligent plants that look like carrots with arms, legs, and a head, which "sleep" part of the time by inserting themselves in soil on plots of land and absorbing sunlight through photosynthesis, and which are awake part of the time, emerging from their plots of soil as locomoting beings who participate in all the complex activities of a modern industrial civilization. Stapledon also describes how life evolved on this planet.
- Superman: Superman's home planet, Krypton, orbited a red star called Rao. Rao is sometimes described as being a red dwarf, although it is more often referred to as a red giant.
- Ready Jet Go!: In the children's show Ready Jet Go!, Carrot, Celery and Jet are a family of aliens known as Bortronians who come from Bortron 7, a planet orbiting the fictional red dwarf Bortron.
- Aurelia: This planet, seen in the speculative documentary Extraterrestrial (also known as Alien Worlds), details what scientist theorize alien life could be like on a planet orbiting a red dwarf star.

== See also ==
- Acaryochloris marina
- Astrobiology
- Habitable zone
- Gliese 581g
- Habitability of F-type main-sequence star systems
- Habitability of K-type main-sequence star systems
- Habitability of neutron star systems
- Habitability of G-type main-sequence star systems
- Kepler-186f
- Planetary habitability
- Search for extraterrestrial intelligence (SETI)
