= Life on the Moon =

Life on the Moon may refer to:

- Colonization of the Moon
- The Great Moon Hoax, 1835 hoax about the supposed discovery of life on the Moon
- Il mondo della luna, an opera buffa written by Joseph Haydn
- Planetary habitability in the Solar System#The Moon
