= List of ocean worlds in the Solar System =

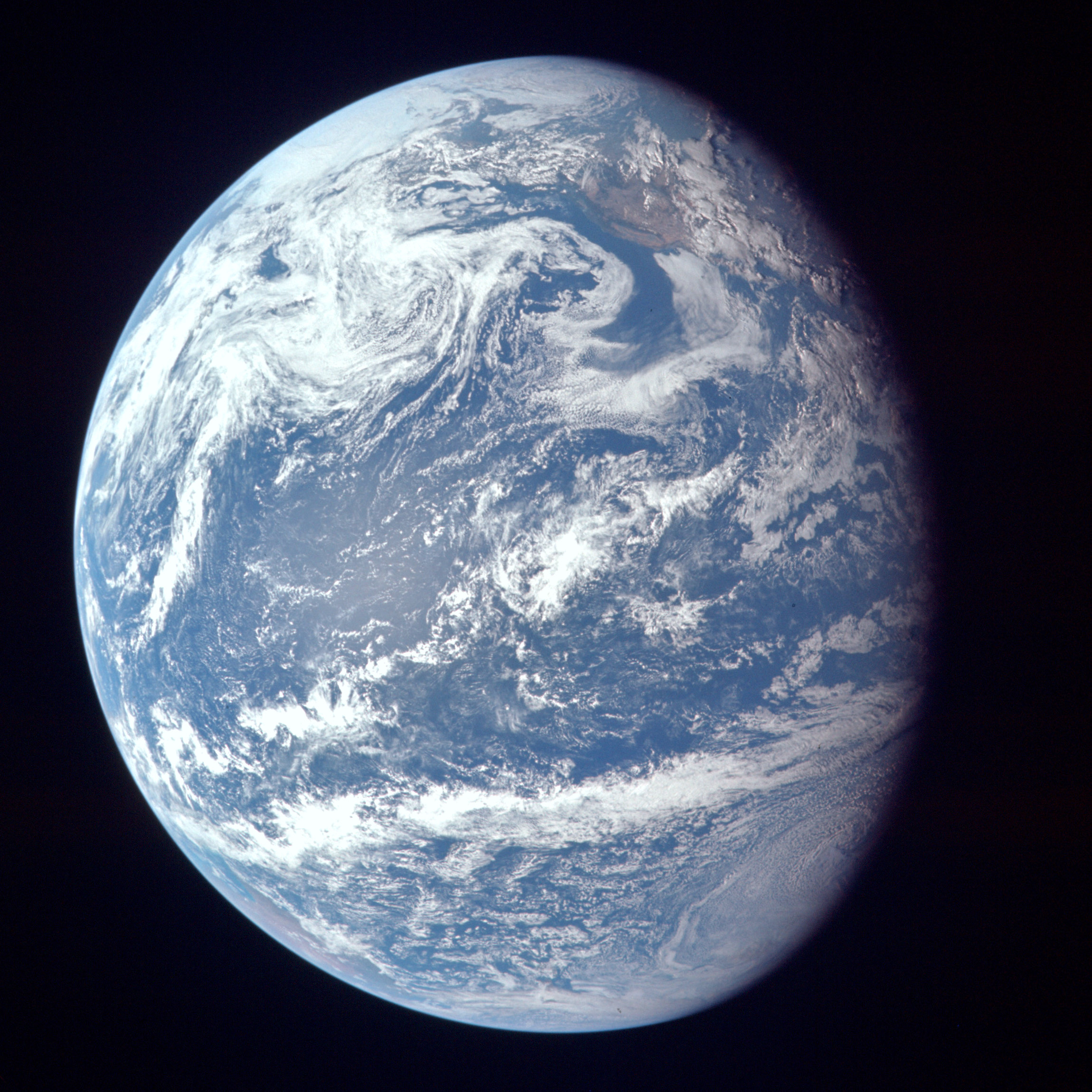
Earth's surface is dominated by the ocean, which forms 71% of Earth's surface.

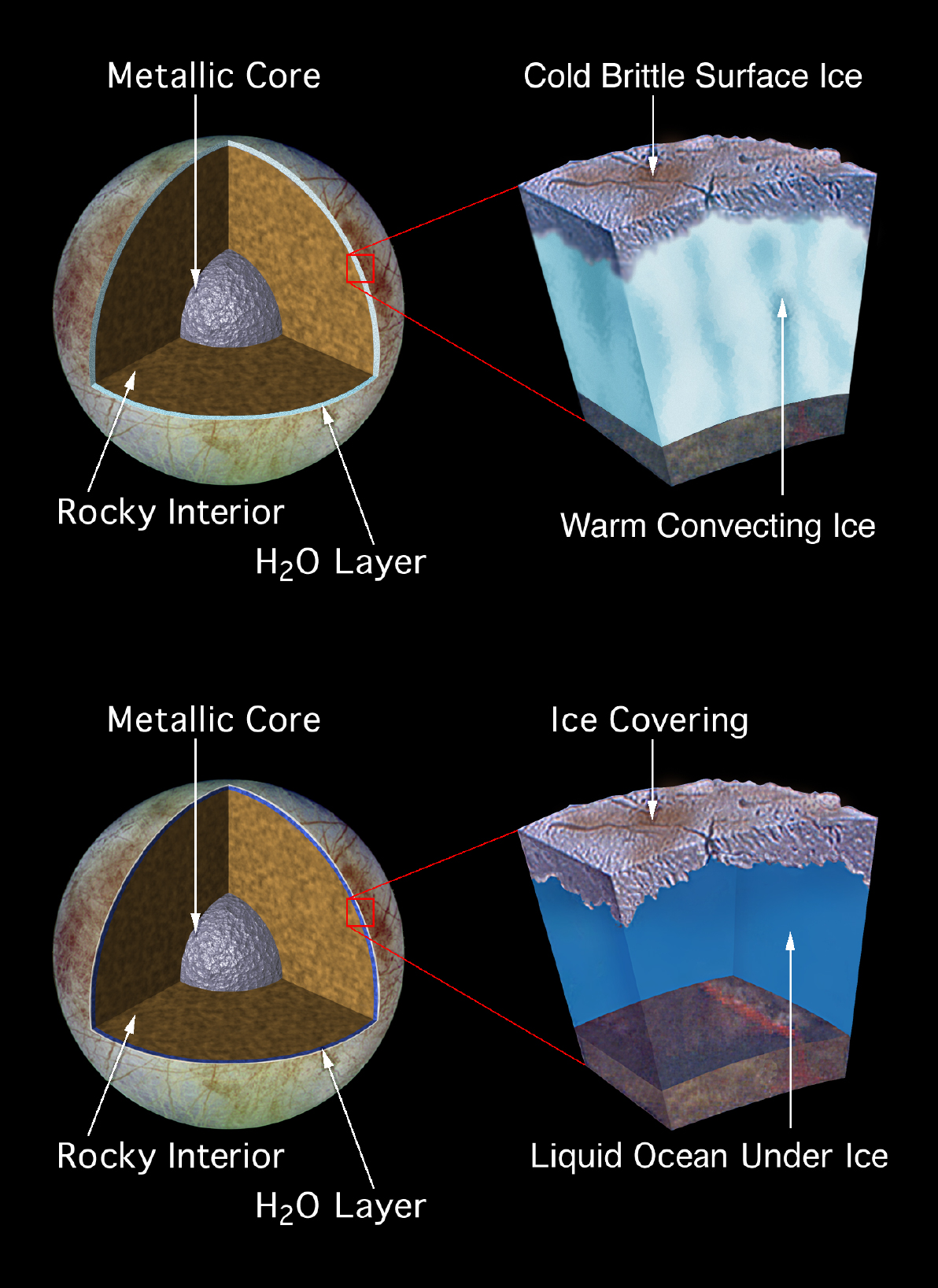
Two possible models of Europa

This is a list of ocean worlds in the Solar System, planets or satellites known or suspected to harbor substantial volumes of liquid water, either as subsurface oceans beneath ice shells or, in the case of Io, a global magma ocean. The existence of such oceans is inferred through a range of methods, including spacecraft measurements of induced magnetic fields, tidal Love numbers, libration amplitudes, surface geology, and isotopic geochemistry.

As of 2026, three worlds have strong or confirmed evidence of present-day global oceans: Enceladus, where the Cassini spacecraft directly sampled water-ice plumes erupting from a tidally heated interior; Europa, whose Galileo-detected induced magnetic field implies a conductive saltwater layer; and Ganymede, where Hubble Space Telescope observations of auroral oscillations point to an ocean that may exceed the volume of Earth's oceans. Callisto and Pluto are considered probable ocean worlds, while the status of Titan—long thought to host a global water–ammonia ocean—was called into question by a 2025 reanalysis of Cassini tidal data that favors a slushy interior with localized liquid pockets rather than a continuous ocean.

Beyond these, a growing number of icy moons, dwarf planets, and trans-Neptunian objects are considered candidates on the basis of interior modeling, spacecraft gravity data, or recent James Webb Space Telescope observations of surface chemistry indicative of geothermal activity. Several bodies, including Charon, Rhea, and Tethys, may have possessed oceans in the past that have since frozen. NASA's Ocean Worlds Exploration Program, established in 2016, coordinates exploration of these targets, with Europa Clipper (launched 2024), JUICE (launched 2023), and Dragonfly (planned launch in 2028) representing the next generation of dedicated missions.

== List ==
Ocean worlds of the Solar System
World	Confirmed?	Ocean volume (vs. Earth)	Activity	Key observations/evidence	Dedicated missions (past → planned)
Earth	Yes (surface + subsurface)	1× (reference: ~1.335 billion km^{3})	Plate tectonics; hydrothermal vents; active water cycle	Direct observation; only known world with stable surface liquid water and confirmed biosphere	—
Mars	Deep crustal liquid water (aquifer, not discrete ocean)	Potentially large (≥ Earth's oceans by volume, if global)	Ancient surface water; no present surface activity (see also Mars ocean hypothesis)	InSight seismic data: low-velocity mid-crust layer at ~5–20 km depth consistent with liquid-water-saturated rock; contested MARSIS radar detection of possible subglacial lake (see also Chronology of discoveries of water on Mars)	Viking, Mars Express, InSight, Tianwen-1/Zhurong, Perseverance (all past/active)
Europa	Strong evidence	≈ 2–3×	Possible plumes; young/chaotic ice	Induced magnetic field (Galileo); reanalysis/plume hints (HST/Galileo)	Galileo → Europa Clipper (launched Oct 2024; Jupiter arrival April 2030); JUICE flybys
Enceladus	Yes (global)	≪ Earth (tiny; sub-percent)	Active south-polar plumes; hydrothermal indicators	Cassini plume sampling (H₂, salts); gravity+libration ⇒ global ocean	Cassini → (concept) Enceladus Orbilander
Ganymede	Strong evidence	Likely > Earth (ocean alone may exceed Earth's)	No known plumes; intrinsic magnetosphere	HST auroral oval "rocking" consistent with conductive layer (ocean); interior models	Galileo, Juno flyby → JUICE (Jupiter arrival July 2031; Ganymede orbit Dec 2034)
Callisto	Probable	Unknown	Geologically quiet	Induced magnetic field (Galileo); later analyses strengthen case	Galileo → JUICE flybys
Titan	Disputed (challenged 2025)	Unknown (water–ammonia)	Active methane cycle; cryovolcanism unconfirmed	Gravity/tides (Love number k₂) & rotation anomalies initially implied ocean; 2025 reanalysis argues tidal dissipation precludes a global ocean, favoring slushy ice with liquid pockets	Cassini–Huygens → Dragonfly rotorcraft (launch July 2028; arrival ~2034)
Triton	Possible	Unknown	Geysers/cryovolcanism seen by Voyager 2	Geology/topography and thermal models; possible deep ocean	Voyager 2 → (no selected mission; Trident not chosen)
Dione	Candidate	Unknown	Low current activity	Cassini gravity/topography; possible global ocean	Cassini flybys
Rhea	Disfavored (possibly past)	Unknown	No endogenic activity observed	Hussmann et al. modeled possible ocean; more recent data suggest homogeneous interior, ocean unlikely to persist today	Cassini flybys
Tethys	Disfavored (possibly past)	Unknown	Extensional tectonics (Ithaca Chasma)	Surface fractures attributed to past ocean freezing; no present ocean expected	Cassini flybys
Mimas	New evidence (young global ocean)	≪ Earth (very small)	No obvious surface activity	Cassini astrometry/periapsis drift ⇒ ocean at depth 20–30 km; ocean <25 Myr old	Cassini flybys
Miranda	Candidate	Unknown	Ancient extreme tectonics	Voyager 2 imagery; Uranus-system radiation data suggests activity	Voyager 2 → (proposed) Uranus Orbiter & Probe
Ariel	Candidate (may be active)	Unknown	Young resurfacing	Uranus radiation-belt/ring data modeling; geology	Voyager 2 → (proposed) Uranus Orbiter & Probe
Titania	Candidate	Unknown	Tectonic features	Interior modeling (possible ocean)	Voyager 2 → (proposed) Uranus Orbiter & Probe
Umbriel	Candidate	Unknown	Dark, old surface	Modeling; possible ammonia-rich ocean	Voyager 2 → (proposed) Uranus Orbiter & Probe
Oberon	Candidate	Unknown	Fractures/tectonics	Modeling (possible ocean)	Voyager 2 → (proposed) Uranus Orbiter & Probe
Ceres	Regional brines (not global)	Negligible vs Earth	Recent brine upwelling (Occator), cryovolcanism	Dawn gravity/geomorphology ⇒ subsurface brines	Dawn orbiter (2015–2018)
Pluto	Likely	Unknown	Tectonics; ongoing surface reshaping	New Horizons: Sputnik Planitia reorientation ⇒ subsurface ocean	New Horizons flyby (2015)
Charon	Past ocean (now frozen)	Unknown	Extensional tectonics; cryovolcanic plains	Canyons and smooth plains (Vulcan Planitia) consistent with refreezing ocean; thermal-orbital models	New Horizons flyby (2015)
Eris	Hypothesized	Unknown	Unknown	JWST methane isotopologue D/H ratios suggest geothermal interior; tidal locking with Dysnomia implies dissipative interior	—
Makemake	Hypothesized	Unknown	Unknown	JWST methane D/H ratios suggest internal geochemical activity	—
Sedna	Hypothesized	Unknown	Unknown	Interior modeling predicts possible ocean with ammonia antifreeze; JWST observations of similar TNOs suggest internal differentiation may be common	—
Quaoar	Hypothesized	Unknown	Possible cryovolcanism (methane/ethane detected)	Theoretical modeling; JWST spectroscopy suggests internal differentiation and possible geothermal activity	—
Gonggong	Hypothesized	Unknown	Unknown	Theoretical modeling; JWST spectroscopy consistent with endogenic processes on large TNOs	—
Orcus	Hypothesized	Unknown	Unknown	Interior modeling predicts possible ocean with ammonia antifreeze (modeled as "2004 DW")	—
Io	Magma ocean (silicate), not water	n/a	Extreme volcanism	Electromagnetic/induction signatures ⇒ global magma ocean	Galileo, Juno flybys

== See also ==
- Water on terrestrial planets of the Solar System
- Extraterrestrial liquid water
- Origin of water on Earth
- Planetary habitability in the Solar System
- Habitable zone
- Habitable zone for complex life
