= Extraterrestrial liquid water =

Liquid water naturally occurring outside Earth

Saturn's moon Enceladus has a subsurface ocean of liquid water feeding its geyser-like eruptions.

Extraterrestrial liquid water is water in its liquid state that naturally occurs outside Earth. It is a subject of wide interest because it is recognized as one of the key prerequisites for life as we know it and is thus surmised to be essential for extraterrestrial life.

Although many celestial bodies in the Solar System have a hydrosphere, Earth is the only celestial body known to have stable bodies of liquid water on its surface, with oceanic water covering 71% of its surface, which is essential to life on Earth. The presence of liquid water is maintained by Earth's atmospheric pressure and stable orbit in the Sun's circumstellar habitable zone; however, the origin of Earth's water remains uncertain.

The main methods currently used for confirmation are absorption spectroscopy and geochemistry. These techniques have proven effective for atmospheric water vapor and ice. However, using current methods of astronomical spectroscopy it is substantially more difficult to detect liquid water on terrestrial planets, especially in the case of subsurface water. Due to this, astronomers, astrobiologists and planetary scientists use habitable zone, gravitational and tidal theory, models of planetary differentiation and radiometry to determine the potential for liquid water. Water observed in volcanic activity can provide more compelling indirect evidence, as can fluvial features and the presence of antifreeze agents, such as salts or ammonia.

Using such methods, many scientists infer that liquid water once covered large areas of Mars and Venus. Water is thought to exist as liquid beneath the surface of some planetary bodies, similar to groundwater on Earth. Water vapour is sometimes considered conclusive evidence for the presence of liquid water, although atmospheric water vapour may be found to exist in many places where liquid water does not. Similar indirect evidence, however, supports the existence of liquids below the surface of several moons and dwarf planets elsewhere in the Solar System. Some are speculated to be large extraterrestrial "oceans". Liquid water is thought to be common in other planetary systems, despite the lack of conclusive evidence, and there is a growing list of extrasolar candidates for liquid water. In June 2020, NASA scientists reported that it is likely that exoplanets with oceans may be common in the Milky Way galaxy, based on mathematical modeling studies.

== Significance ==
Water is a fundamental element for the biochemistry of all known living beings. With some areas on Earth such as deserts being drier than others, their local lifeforms are adapted to make efficient use of the scarce available water.

No known lifeform can live completely without water.

It is also one of the simplest molecules, composed of one oxygen and two hydrogen atoms, and can be found in all celestial bodies of the solar system. It is only useful for life in a liquid state, and extraterrestrial water is commonly found as water vapor or ice. Although life eventually adapted to live on land, the first forms of life on Earth appeared in liquid water. As a result, the search for extraterrestrial liquid water is closely related with the search of extraterrestrial life.

Liquid water also has several properties that are beneficial for lifeforms. For example, unlike most other liquids, it becomes less dense when it solidifies rather than denser. As a result, if a body of water gets cold enough, the ice floats and eventually creates an ice layer, trapping liquid water and its ecosystems below. Without this property, lakes and oceans would become ice in their full size, along with any creatures living in them.

== Liquid water in the Solar System ==
As of December 2015, the confirmed liquid water in the Solar System outside Earth is 25–50 times the volume of Earth's water (1.3 billion km^{3}), i.e. about 3.25–6.5 × 10^{10} km^{3} (32.5 to 65 billion km^{3}) and 3.25–6.5 × 10^{19} tons (32.5 to 65 billion billion tons) of water.

=== Mars ===
The Mars ocean theory suggests that nearly a third of the surface of Mars was once covered by water, though the water on Mars is no longer oceanic.

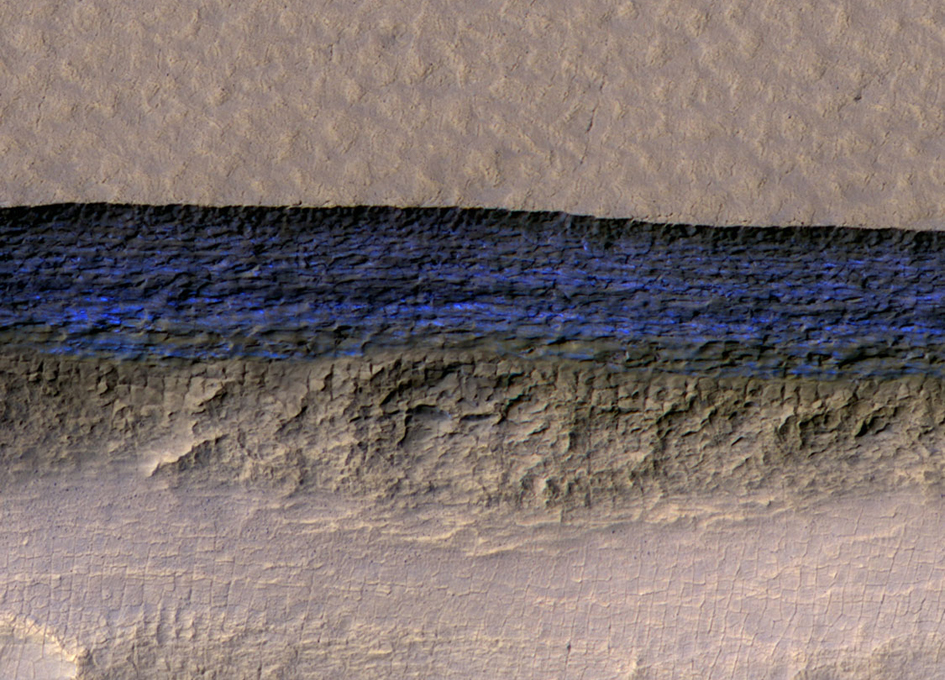
A cross-section of Mars underground ice is exposed at the steep slope that appears bright blue in this enhanced-color view from the MRO. The scene is about 500 meters wide. The scarp drops about 128 meters from the level ground in the upper third of the image.

Water on Mars exists today almost exclusively as ice and underground, with a small amount present in the atmosphere as vapor. Some liquid water may occur transiently on the Martian surface today but only under certain conditions. No large standing bodies of liquid water exist because the atmospheric pressure at the surface averages just 600 pascals (0.087 psi)—about 0.6% of Earth's mean sea level pressure—and because the global average temperature is far too low (210 K (−63 °C)), leading to either rapid evaporation or freezing. Features called recurring slope lineae are thought to be caused by flows of brine—hydrated salts.

In July 2018, scientists from the Italian Space Agency reported the detection of a subglacial lake on Mars, 1.5 kilometres (0.93 mi) below the southern polar ice cap, and spanning 20 kilometres (12 mi) horizontally, the first evidence for a stable body of liquid water on the planet. Because the temperature at the base of the polar cap is estimated at 205 K (−68 °C; −91 °F), scientists assume that the water may remain liquid due to the antifreeze effect of magnesium and calcium perchlorates. The 1.5-kilometre (0.93 mi) ice layer covering the lake is composed of water ice with 10 to 20% admixed dust, and seasonally covered by a 1-metre (3 ft 3 in)-thick layer of CO_{2} ice.

=== Europa ===
Scientists' consensus is that a layer of liquid water exists beneath the surface of Europa, a moon of Jupiter and that heat from tidal flexing allows the subsurface ocean to remain liquid. It is estimated that the outer crust of solid ice is approximately 10–30 km (6.2–18.6 mi) thick, including a ductile "warm ice" layer, which could mean that the liquid ocean underneath may be about 100 km (62 mi) deep. This leads to a volume of Europa's oceans of 3 × 10^{18} m^{3} (3 billion km^{3}), more than twice the volume of Earth's oceans.

=== Enceladus ===
Enceladus, a moon of Saturn, has shown geysers of water, confirmed by the Cassini spacecraft in 2005 and analyzed more deeply in 2008. Gravimetric data in 2010–2011 confirmed a subsurface ocean. While previously believed to be localized, most likely in a portion of the southern hemisphere, evidence revealed in 2015 now suggests the subsurface ocean is global in nature.

In addition to water, these geysers from vents near the south pole contained small amounts of salt, nitrogen, carbon dioxide, and volatile hydrocarbons. The melting of the ocean water and the geysers appear to be driven by tidal flux from Saturn.

=== Mimas ===
Mimas, another moon of Saturn similar in size and orbit to Enceladus, was found by Cassini to have a "rocking" motion whose amplitude could only be explained by a large subsurface ocean.

=== Ganymede ===
A subsurface saline ocean is theorized to exist on Ganymede, a moon of Jupiter, following observation by the Hubble Space Telescope in 2015. Patterns in auroral belts and rocking of the magnetic field suggest the presence of an ocean. It is estimated to be 100 km deep with the surface lying below a crust of 150 km of ice. As of 2015, the precise quantity of liquid water on Ganymede is highly uncertain (1–33 times as much as Earth).

=== Ceres ===
Ceres appears to be differentiated into a rocky core and icy mantle, and may have a remnant internal ocean of liquid water under the layer of ice. The surface is probably a mixture of water ice and various hydrated minerals such as carbonates and clay. In January 2014, emissions of water vapor were detected from several regions of Ceres. This was unexpected, because large bodies in the asteroid belt do not typically emit vapor, a hallmark of comets. Ceres also features a mountain called Ahuna Mons that is thought to be a cryovolcanic dome that facilitates the movement of high viscosity cryovolcanic magma consisting of water ice softened by its content of salts.

=== Ice giants ===
The ice giant planets Uranus and Neptune are thought to have a supercritical water ocean beneath their clouds, which accounts for about two-thirds of their total mass, most likely surrounding small rocky cores, although a 2006 study by Wiktorowicz and Ingersall ruled out the possibility of such a water "ocean" existing on Neptune. This kind of planet is thought to be common in extrasolar planetary systems.

=== Pluto ===
In June 2020, astronomers reported evidence that Pluto may have had a subsurface ocean, and consequently may have been habitable, when it was first formed.

== Indicators, methods of detection and confirmation ==
Most known extrasolar planetary systems appear to have very different compositions to the Solar System, though there is probably sample bias arising from the detection methods.

=== Spectroscopy ===
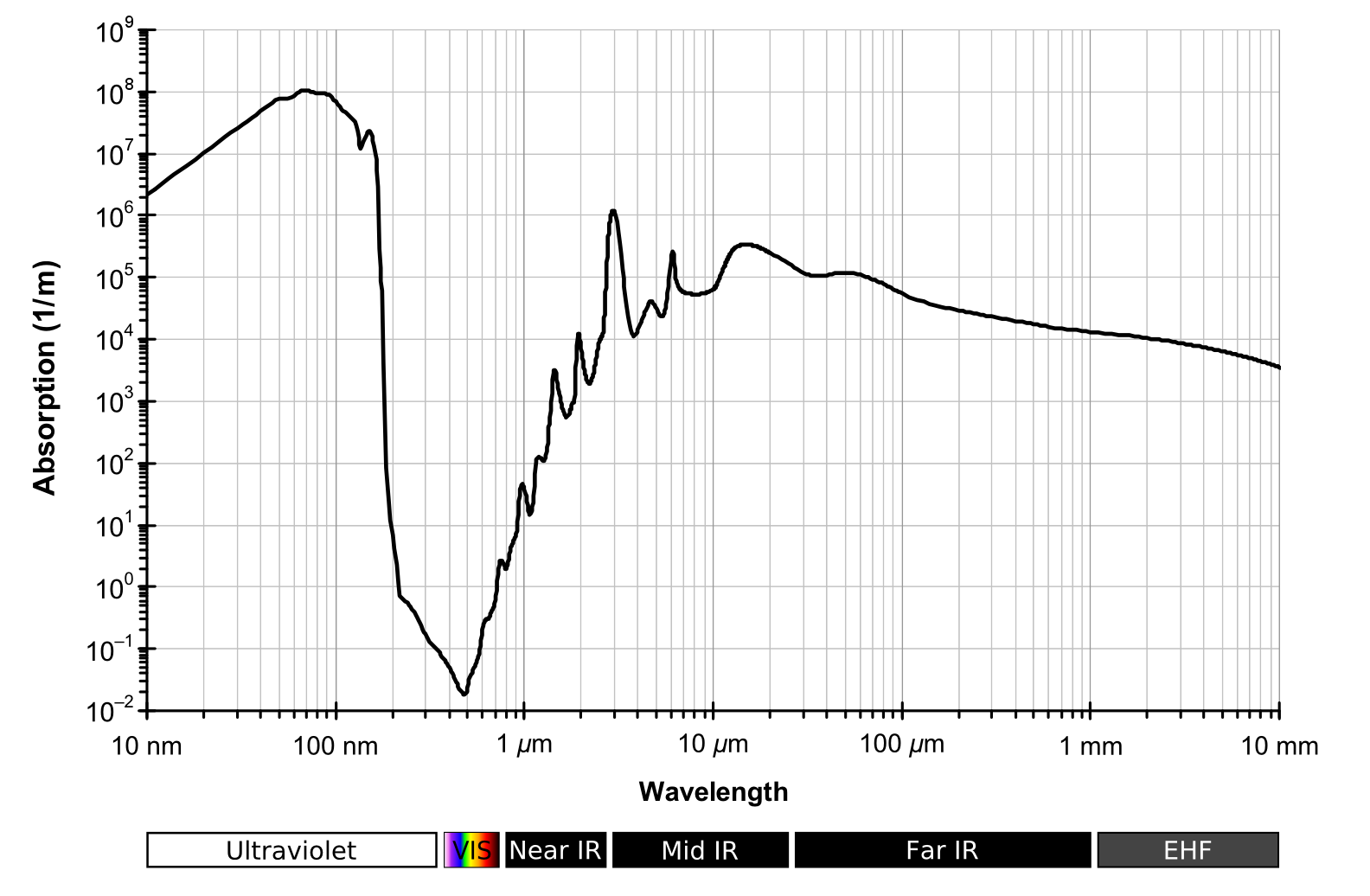
Absorption spectrum of liquid water

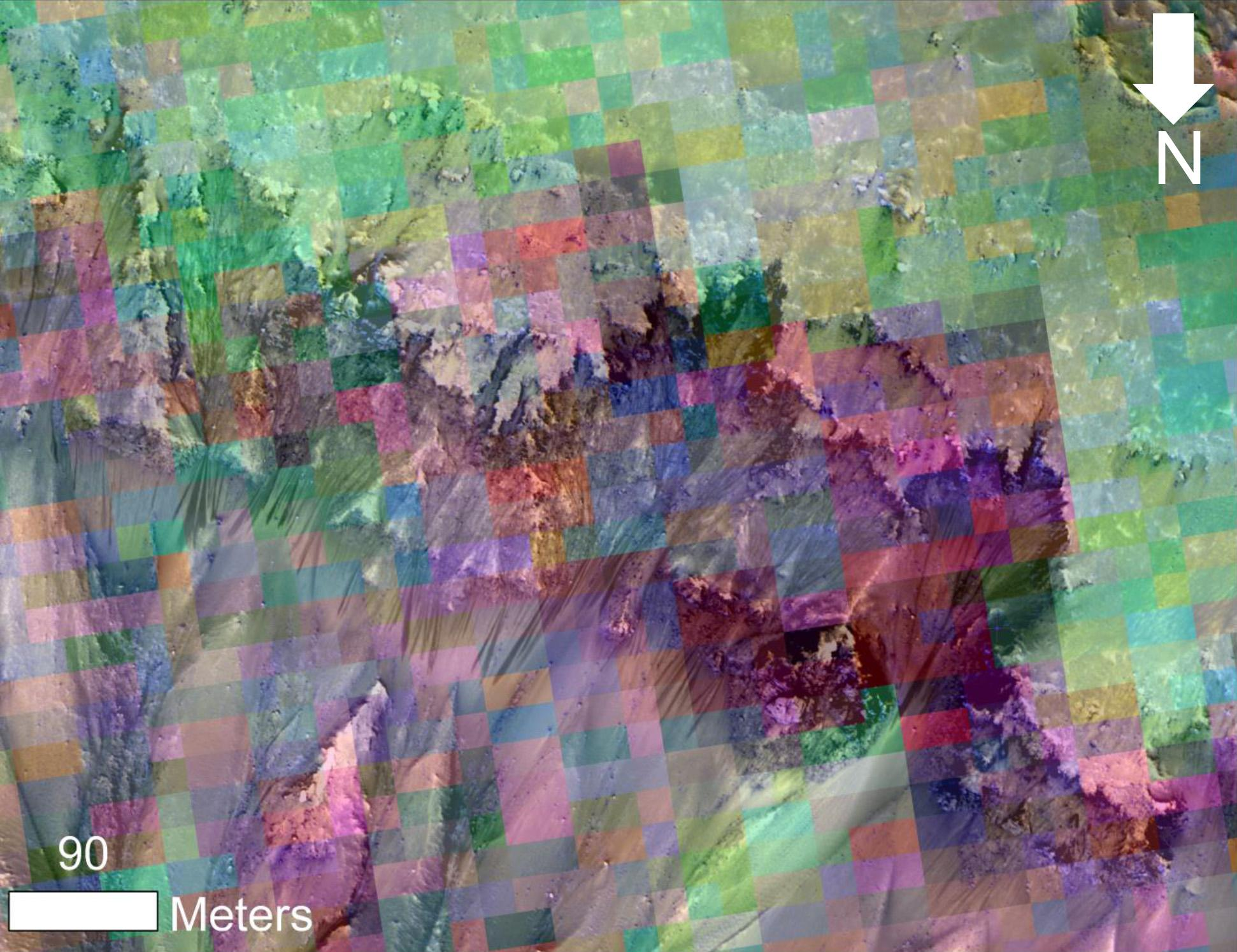
Liquid water has not been detected in spectroscopic analysis of suspected seasonal Martian flows.

Liquid water has a distinct absorption spectroscopy signature compared to other states of water due to the state of its hydrogen bonds. Despite the confirmation of extraterrestrial water vapor and ice, however, the spectral signature of liquid water is yet to be confirmed outside of Earth. The signatures of surface water on terrestrial planets may be undetectable through thick atmospheres across the vast distances of space using current technology.

Seasonal flows on warm Martian slopes, though strongly suggestive of briny liquid water, have yet to indicate this in spectroscopic analysis.

Water vapor has been confirmed in numerous objects via spectroscopy, though it does not by itself confirm the presence of liquid water. However, when combined with other observations, the possibility might be inferred. For example, the density of GJ 1214 b would suggest that a large fraction of its mass is water and follow-up detection by the Hubble telescope of the presence of water vapor strongly suggests that exotic materials like 'hot ice' or 'superfluid water' may be present.

=== Magnetic fields ===
For the Jovian moons Ganymede and Europa, the existence of a sub-ice ocean is inferred from the measurements of the magnetic field of Jupiter. Since conductors moving through a magnetic field produce a counter-electromotive field, the presence of the water below the surface was deduced from the change in magnetic field as the moon passed from the northern to southern magnetic hemisphere of Jupiter.

=== Geological indicators ===
Thomas Gold has posited that many Solar System bodies could potentially hold groundwater below the surface.

It is thought that liquid water may exist in the Martian subsurface. Research suggests that in the past there was liquid water flowing on the surface, creating large areas similar to Earth's oceans. However, the question remains as to where the water has gone. There are a number of direct and indirect proofs of water's presence either on or under the surface, e.g. stream beds, polar caps, spectroscopic measurement, eroded craters or minerals directly connected to the existence of liquid water (such as Goethite). In an article in the Journal of Geophysical Research, scientists studied Lake Vostok in Antarctica and discovered that it may have implications for liquid water still being on Mars. Through their research, scientists came to the conclusion that if Lake Vostok existed before the perennial glaciation began, that it is likely that the lake did not freeze all the way to the bottom. Due to this hypothesis, scientists say that if water had existed before the polar ice caps on Mars, it is likely that there is still liquid water below the ice caps that may even contain evidence of life.

"Chaos terrain", a common feature on Europa's surface, is interpreted by researchers studying images of Europa taken by NASA's Galileo spacecraft as regions where the subsurface ocean has melted through the icy crust.

=== Volcanic observation ===
A possible mechanism for cryovolcanism on bodies like Enceladus

Geysers have been found on Enceladus, a moon of Saturn, and Europa, a moon of Jupiter. These contain water vapour and could be indicators of liquid water deeper down. It could also be just ice. In June 2009, using data gathered by NASA's Casini spacecraft, researchers noticed that Enceladus wobbled in a certain way as it orbited Saturn. That wobble indicated that the moon's icy crust didn't extend all the way to its core and instead, it rested on a global ocean, the researchers concluded. On 3 April 2014, NASA reported that evidence for a large underground ocean of liquid water on Enceladus had been found by the Cassini spacecraft. According to the scientists, evidence of an underground ocean suggests that Enceladus is one of the most likely places in the solar system to "host microbial life". Material from Enceladus' south polar jets contains salty water and organic molecules, the basic chemical ingredients for life," said Linda Spilker, Cassini's project scientist at JPL. "Their discovery expanded our view of the 'habitable zone' within our solar system and in planetary systems of other stars. Emissions of water vapor have been detected from several regions of the dwarf planet Ceres, combined with evidence of ongoing cryovolcanic activity.

=== Gravitational evidence ===
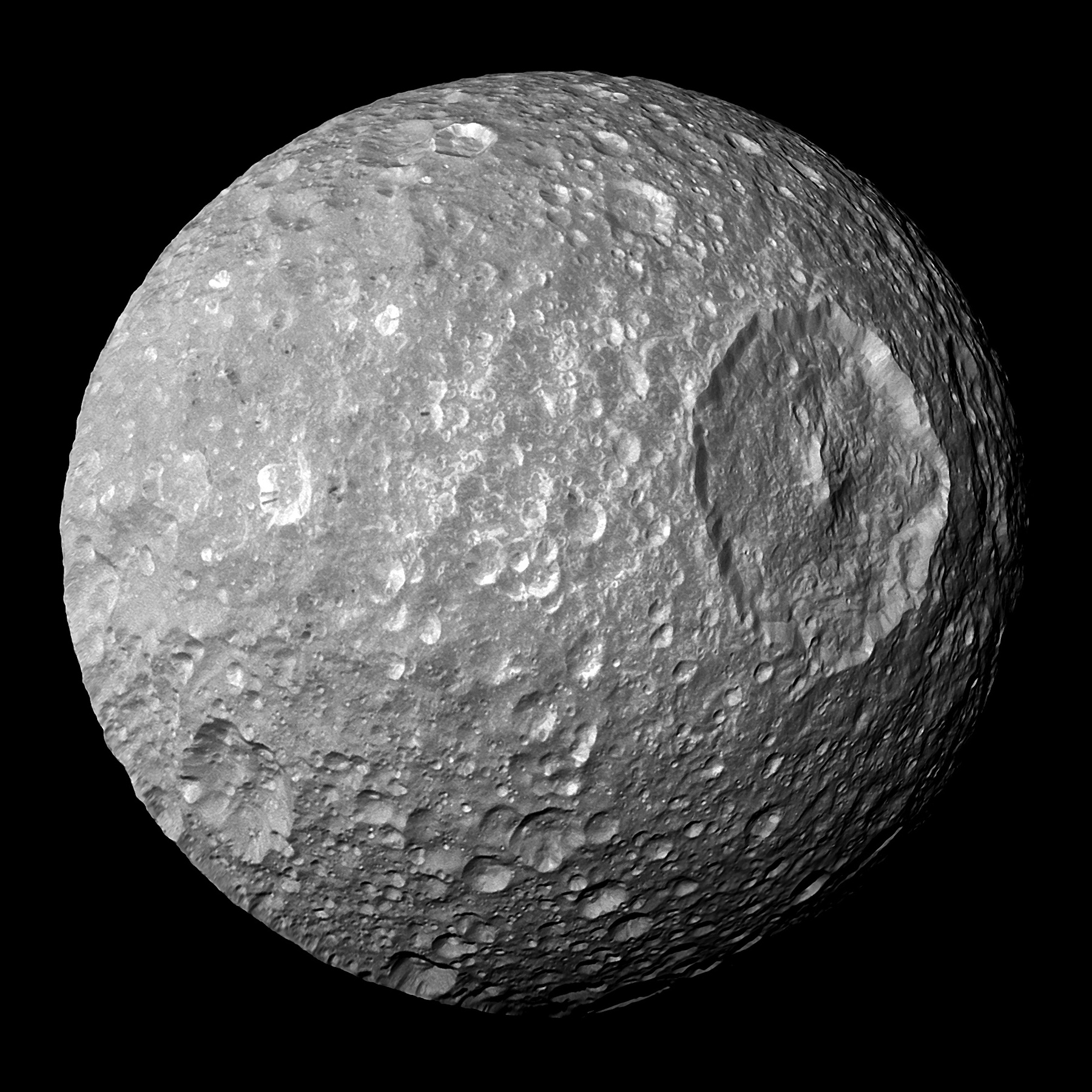
Saturn's tiny moon Mimas, the Solar System's smallest round body, may be a new class of "stealth ocean world".

Scientists' consensus is that a layer of liquid water exists beneath Europa's surface, and that heat energy from tidal flexing allows the subsurface ocean to remain liquid. The first hints of a subsurface ocean came from theoretical considerations of tidal heating (a consequence of Europa's slightly eccentric orbit and orbital resonance with the other Galilean moons).

Scientists used gravitational measurements from the Cassini spacecraft to confirm a water ocean under the crust of Enceladus. Such tidal models have been used as theories for water layers in other Solar System moons. According to at least one gravitational study on Cassini data, Dione has an ocean 100 kilometers below the surface.

Anomalies in the orbital libration of Saturn's moon Mimas combined with models of tidal mechanics led scientists in 2022 to propose that it harbours an internal ocean. The finding has surprised many who believed it was not possible for the Solar System's smallest round body, which was previously believed to be frozen solid, and has led to the classification of a new type of "stealth ocean world".

=== Ground penetrating radio ===
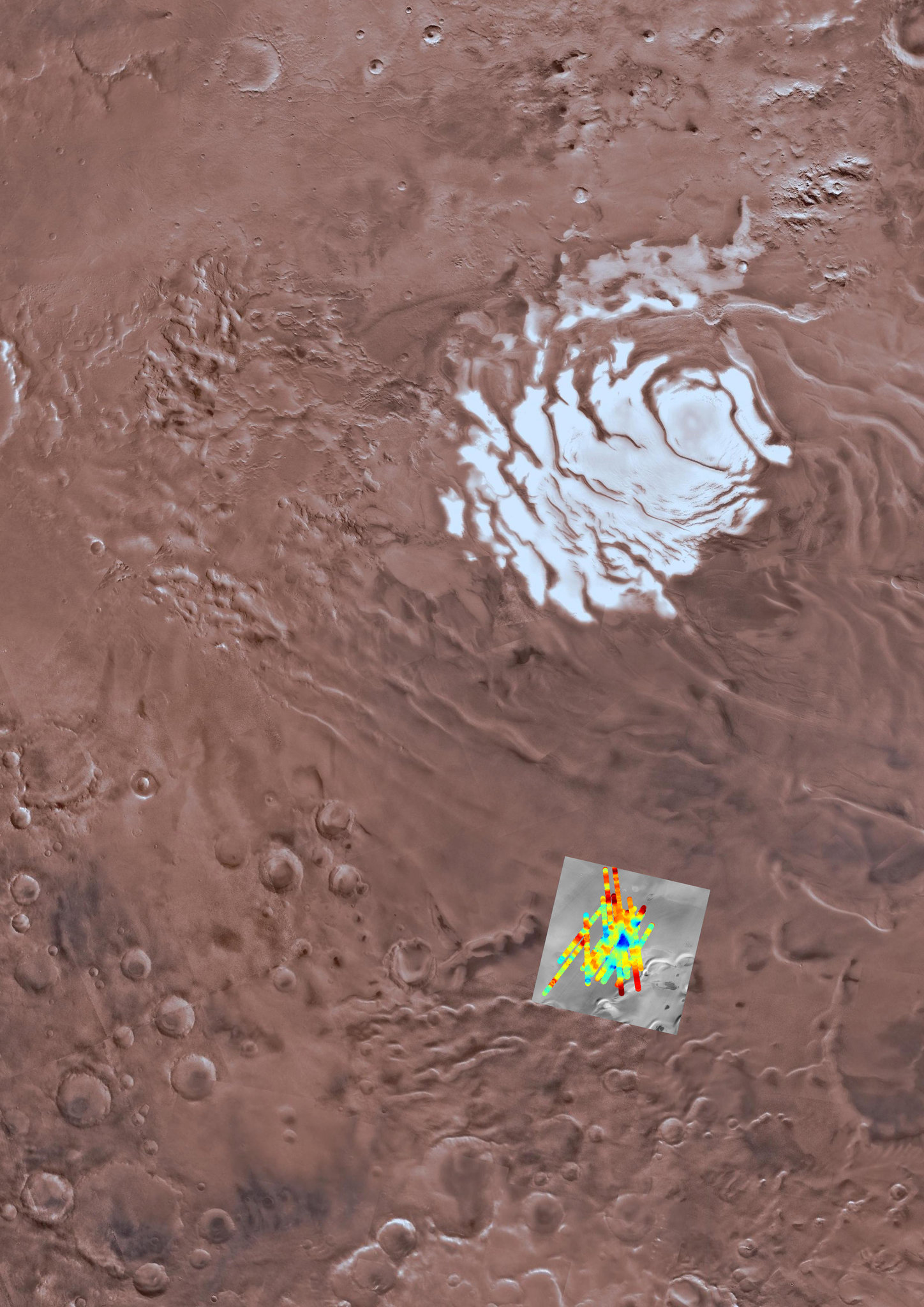
Site of south polar Martian subglacial water body (reported July 2018)

Scientists have detected liquid water using radio signals. The radio detection and ranging (RADAR) instrument of the Cassini probe was used to detect the existence of a layer of liquid water and ammonia beneath the surface of Saturn's moon Titan that are consistent with calculations of the moon's density. Ground penetrating radar and dielectric permittivity data from the MARSIS instrument on Mars Express indicates a 20-kilometer-wide stable body of briny liquid water in the Planum Australe region of planet Mars.

=== Density calculation ===
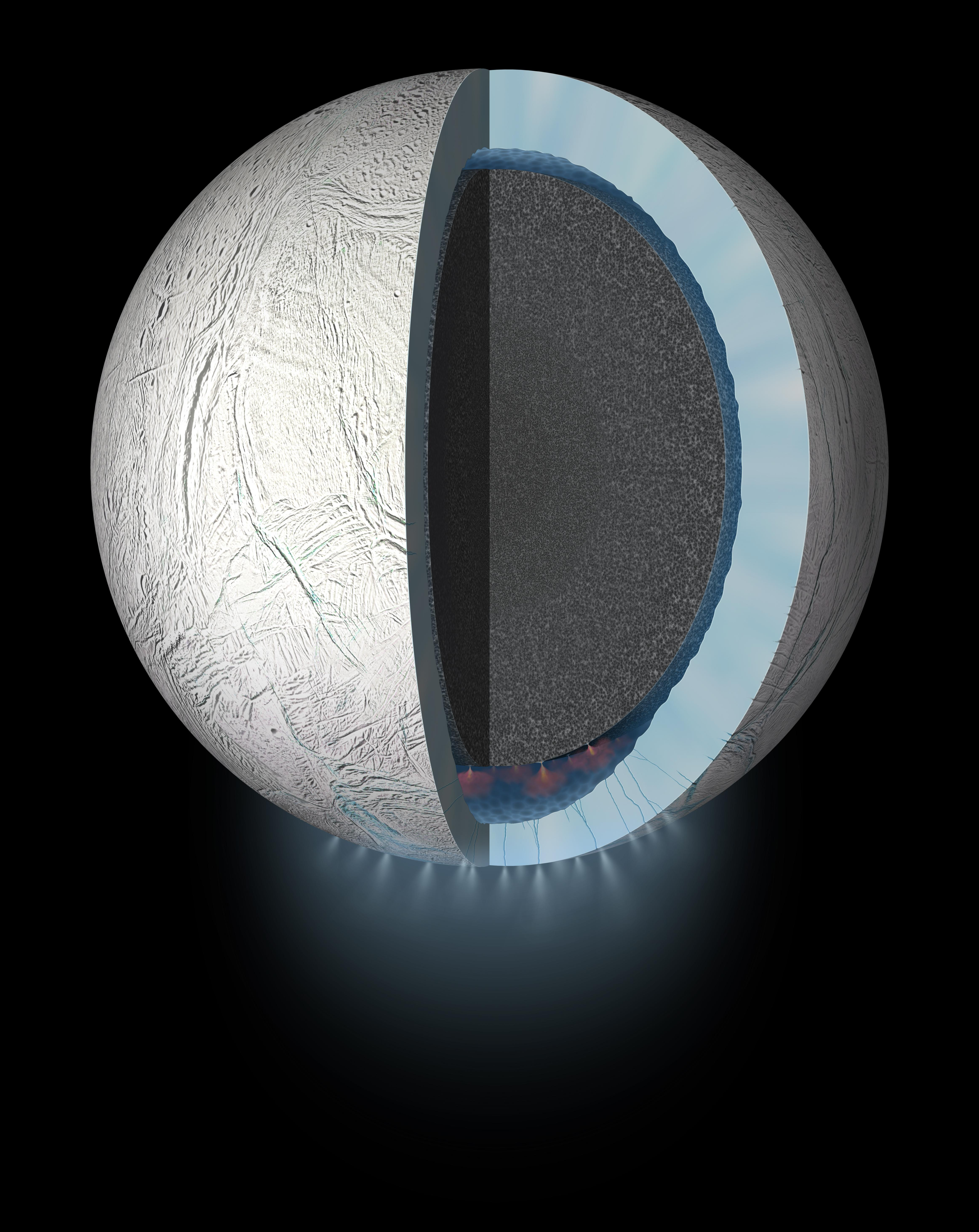
Artists conception of the subsurface water ocean confirmed on Enceladus. Ice crust Global ocean Rocky core The southern polar region shows active jets.

Planetary scientists can use calculations of density to determine the composition of planets and their potential to possess liquid water, though the method is not highly accurate as the combination of many compounds and states can produce similar densities.

Models of Saturn's moon Titan density indicate the presence of a subsurface ocean layer. Similar density estimations are strong indicators of a subsurface ocean on Enceladus.

Initial analysis of 55 Cancri e's low density indicated that it consisted of 30% supercritical fluid which Diana Valencia of the Massachusetts Institute of Technology proposed could be in the form of salty supercritical water, though follow-up analysis of its transit failed to detect traces of either water or hydrogen.

GJ 1214 b was the second exoplanet (after CoRoT-7b) to have an established mass and radius less than those of the giant Solar System planets. It is three times the size of Earth and about 6.5 times as massive. Its low density indicated that it is likely a mix of rock and water, and follow-up observations using the Hubble telescope now seem to confirm that a large fraction of its mass is water, so it is a large waterworld. The high temperatures and pressures would form exotic materials like 'hot ice' or 'superfluid water'.

=== Models of radioactive decay ===
Models of heat retention and heating via radioactive decay in smaller icy Solar System bodies suggest that Rhea, Titania, Oberon, Triton, Pluto, Eris, Sedna, and Orcus may have oceans underneath solid icy crusts approximately 100 km thick. Of particular interest in these cases is the fact that the models indicate that the liquid layers are in direct contact with the rocky core, which allows efficient mixing of minerals and salts into the water. This is in contrast with the oceans that may be inside larger icy satellites like Ganymede, Callisto, or Titan, where layers of high-pressure phases of ice are thought to underlie the liquid water layer.

Models of radioactive decay suggest that MOA-2007-BLG-192Lb, a small planet orbiting a small star could be as warm as the Earth and completely covered by a very deep ocean.

=== Internal differentiation models ===
Diagram showing a possible internal structure of Ceres

Models of Solar System objects indicate the presence of liquid water in their internal differentiation.

Some models of the dwarf planet Ceres, largest object in the asteroid belt indicate the possibility of a wet interior layer. Water vapor detected to be emitted by the dwarf planet may be an indicator, through sublimation of surface ice.

A global layer of liquid water thick enough to decouple the crust from the mantle is thought to be present on Titan, Europa and, with less certainty, Callisto, Ganymede and Triton. Other icy moons may also have internal oceans, or have once had internal oceans that have now frozen.

=== Habitable zone ===
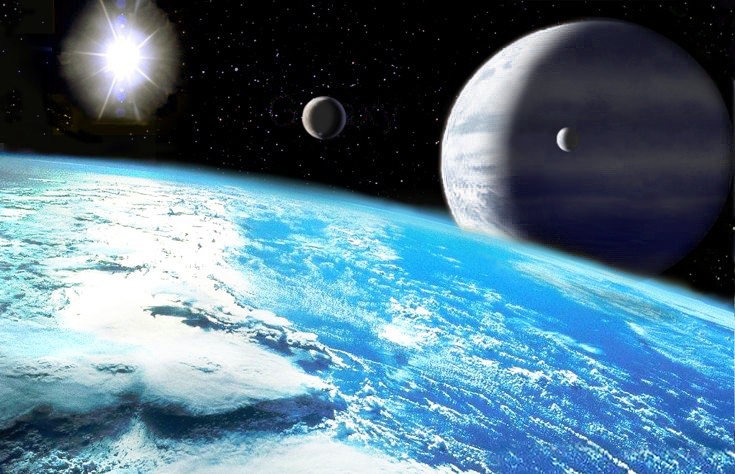
Artist's impression of a class II planet with water vapor clouds, as seen from a hypothetical large moon with surface liquid water

A planet's orbit in the circumstellar habitable zone is a popular method used to predict its potential for surface water at its surface. Habitable zone theory has put forward several extrasolar candidates for liquid water, though they are highly speculative as a planet's orbit around a star alone does not guarantee that it has liquid water. In addition to its orbit, a planetary mass object must have the potential for sufficient atmospheric pressure to support liquid water and a sufficient supply of hydrogen and oxygen at or near its surface.

The Gliese 581 planetary system contains multiple planets that may be candidates for surface water, including Gliese 581c, Gliese 581d, might be warm enough for oceans if a greenhouse effect was operating, and Gliese 581e.

Gliese 667 C has three of them are in the habitable zone including Gliese 667 Cc is estimated to have surface temperatures similar to Earth and a strong chance of liquid water.

Kepler-22b one of the first 54 candidates found by the Kepler telescope and reported is 2.4 times the size of the Earth, with an estimated temperature of 22 °C. It is described as having the potential for surface water, though its composition is currently unknown.

Among the 1,235 possible extrasolar planet candidates detected by NASA's planet-hunting Kepler space telescope during its first four months of operation, 54 are orbiting in the parent star's habitable 'Goldilocks' zone where liquid water could exist. Five of these are near Earth-size.

On 6 January 2015, NASA announced further observations conducted from May 2009 to April 2013 which included eight candidates between one and two times the size of Earth, orbiting in a habitable zone. Of these eight, six orbit stars that are similar to the Sun in size and temperature. Three of the newly confirmed exoplanets were found to orbit within habitable zones of stars similar to the Sun: two of the three, Kepler-438b and Kepler-442b, are near-Earth-size and likely rocky; the third, Kepler-440b, is a super-Earth.

=== Water rich circumstellar disks ===
Artist impression of the protoplanetary disc surrounding MWC 480 which contains large quantities of water and organic molecules – building blocks of life

Long before the discovery of water on asteroids, on comets, and on dwarf planets beyond Neptune, the Solar System's circumstellar disks, beyond the snow line, including the asteroid belt and the Kuiper belt were thought to contain large amounts of water and these were believed to be the Origin of water on Earth. Given that many types of stars are thought to blow volatiles from the system through the photoevaporation effect, water content in circumstellar disks and rocky material in other planetary systems are very good indicators of a planetary system's potential for liquid water and a potential for organic chemistry, especially if detected within the planet forming regions or the habitable zone. Techniques such as interferometry can be used for this.

In 2007, such a disk was found in the habitable zone of MWC 480. In 2008, such a disk was found around the star AA Tauri. In 2009, a similar disk was discovered around the young star HD 142527.

In 2013, a water-rich debris disk around GD 61 accompanied by a confirmed rocky object consisting of magnesium, silicon, iron, and oxygen. The same year, another water rich disk was spotted around HD 100546 has ices close to the star.

There is no guarantee that the other conditions will be found that allow liquid water to be present on a planetary surface. Should planetary mass objects be present, a single, gas giant, with or without planetary mass moons, orbiting close to the circumstellar habitable zone, could prevent the necessary conditions from occurring in the system. However, it would mean that planetary mass objects, such as the icy bodies of the solar system, could have abundant quantities of liquid within them.

== History ==
Lunar maria are vast basaltic plains on the Moon that were thought to be bodies of water by early astronomers, who referred to them as "seas". Galileo expressed some doubt about the lunar 'seas' in his Dialogue Concerning the Two Chief World Systems. (Note: 'Salviati', who normally gives Galileo's own opinions, says: I say then that if there were in nature only one way for two surfaces to be illuminated by the sun so that one appears lighter than the other, and that this were by having one made of land and the other of water, it would be necessary to say that the moon's surface was partly terrene and partly aqueous. But because there are more ways known to us that could produce the same effect, and perhaps others that we do not know of, I shall not make bold to affirm one rather than another to exist on the moon... What is clearly seen in the moon is that the darker parts are all plains, with few rocks and ridges in them, though there are some. The brighter remainder is all fill of rocks, mountains, round ridges, and other shapes, and in particular there are great ranges of mountains around the spots... I think that the material of the lunar globe is not land and water, and this alone is enough to prevent generations and alterations similar to ours.)

Before space probes were landed, the idea of oceans on Venus was credible science, but the planet was discovered to be much too hot.

Telescopic observations from the time of Galileo onward have shown that Mars has no features resembling watery oceans. Mars' dryness was long recognized, and gave credibility to the spurious Martian canals.

=== Ancient water on Venus ===
NASA's Goddard Institute for Space Studies and others have postulated that Venus may have had a shallow ocean in the past for up to 2 billion years, with as much water as Earth. Depending on the parameters used in their theoretical model, the last liquid water could have evaporated as recently as 715 million years ago. However, recent studies of Venus's atmosphere and interior suggest that Venusian surface water evaporated prior to 3 billion years ago or never existed. Currently, the only known water on Venus is in the form of a tiny amount of atmospheric vapor (20 ppm). Hydrogen, a component of water, is still being lost to space as detected by ESA's Venus Express spacecraft.

== Evidence of past surface water ==
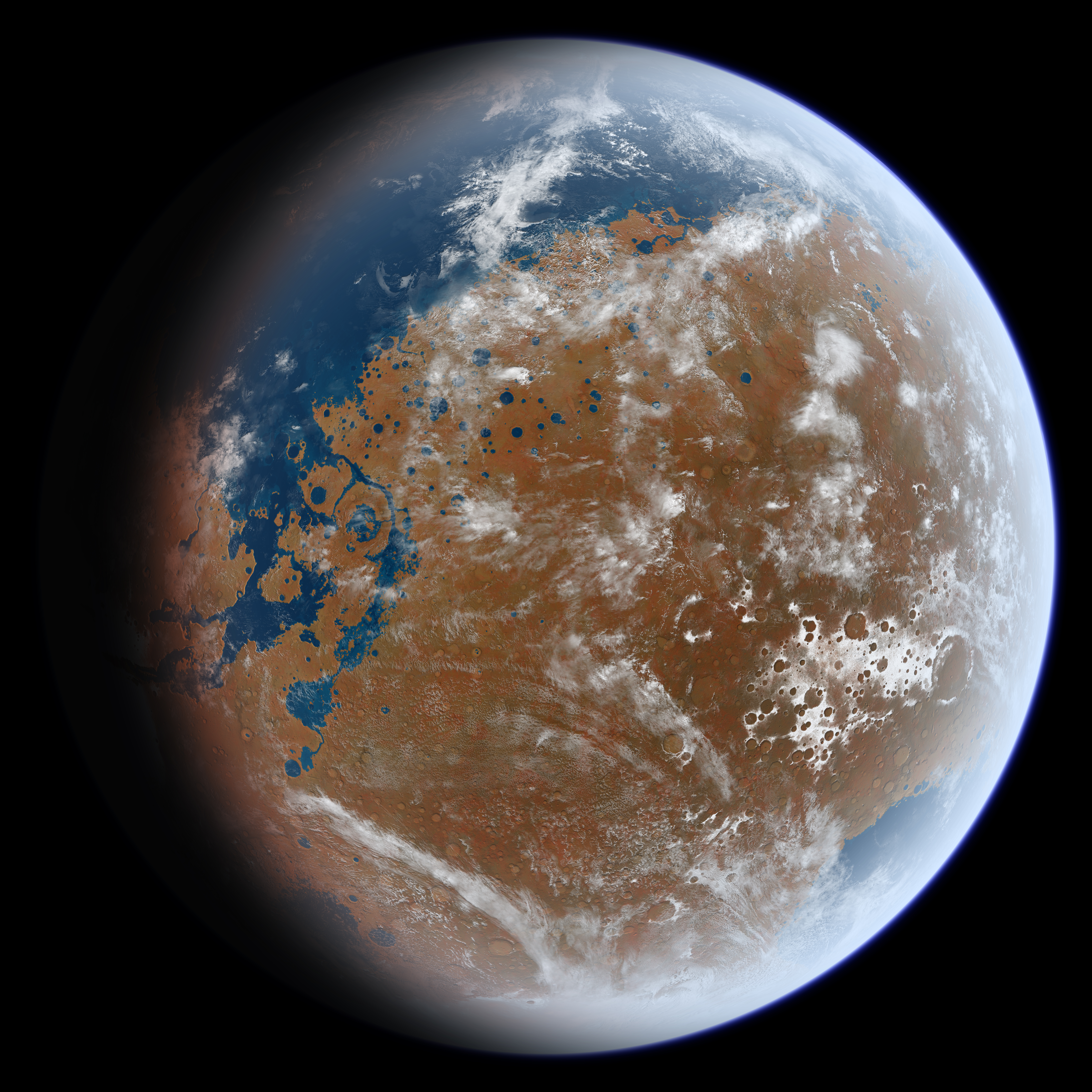
An artist's impression of ancient Mars and its hypothesized oceans based on geological data

Assuming that the giant-impact hypothesis is correct, there were never real seas or oceans on the Moon, only perhaps a little moisture (liquid or ice) in some places, when the Moon had a thin atmosphere created by degassing of volcanoes or impacts of icy bodies.

The Dawn space probe found possible evidence of past water flow on the asteroid Vesta, leading to speculation of underground reservoirs of water-ice.

Astronomers speculate that Venus had liquid water and perhaps oceans in its very early history. Given that Venus has been completely resurfaced by its own active geology, the idea of a primeval ocean is hard to test. Rock samples may one day give the answer.

It was once thought that Mars might have dried up from something more Earth-like. The initial discovery of a cratered surface made this seem unlikely, but further evidence has changed this view. Liquid water may have existed on the surface of Mars in the distant past, and several basins on Mars have been proposed as dry sea beds. The largest is Vastitas Borealis; others include Hellas Planitia and Argyre Planitia.

There is currently much debate over whether Mars once had an ocean of water in its northern hemisphere, and over what happened to it if it did. Findings by the Mars Exploration Rover mission indicate it had some long-term standing water in at least one location, but its extent is not known. The Opportunity Mars rover photographed bright veins of a mineral leading to conclusive confirmation of deposition by liquid water.

On 9 December 2013, NASA reported that the planet Mars had a large freshwater lake (which could have been a hospitable environment for microbial life) based on evidence from the Curiosity rover studying Aeolis Palus near Mount Sharp in Gale Crater.

== Liquid water on comets and asteroids ==
Comets contain large proportions of water ice, but are generally thought to be completely frozen due to their small size and large distance from the Sun. However, studies on dust collected from comet Wild-2 show evidence for liquid water inside the comet at some point in the past. It is yet unclear what source of heat may have caused melting of some of the comet's water ice.

Nevertheless, on 10 December 2014, scientists reported that the composition of water vapor from comet Churyumov–Gerasimenko, as determined by the Rosetta spacecraft, is substantially different from that found on Earth. That is, the ratio of deuterium to hydrogen in the water from the comet was determined to be three times that found for terrestrial water. This makes it very unlikely that water found on Earth came from comets such as comet Churyumov–Gerasimenko according to the scientists.

The asteroid 24 Themis was the first found to have water, including liquid pressurised by non-atmospheric means, dissolved into mineral through ionising radiation. Water has also been found to flow on the large asteroid 4 Vesta heated through periodic impacts.

=== Fluid Inclusions ===
Fluid inclusions have been reported in multiple meteorites, in samples from (162173) Ryugu, and in samples from (101955) Bennu.

== Extrasolar habitable zone candidates for water ==
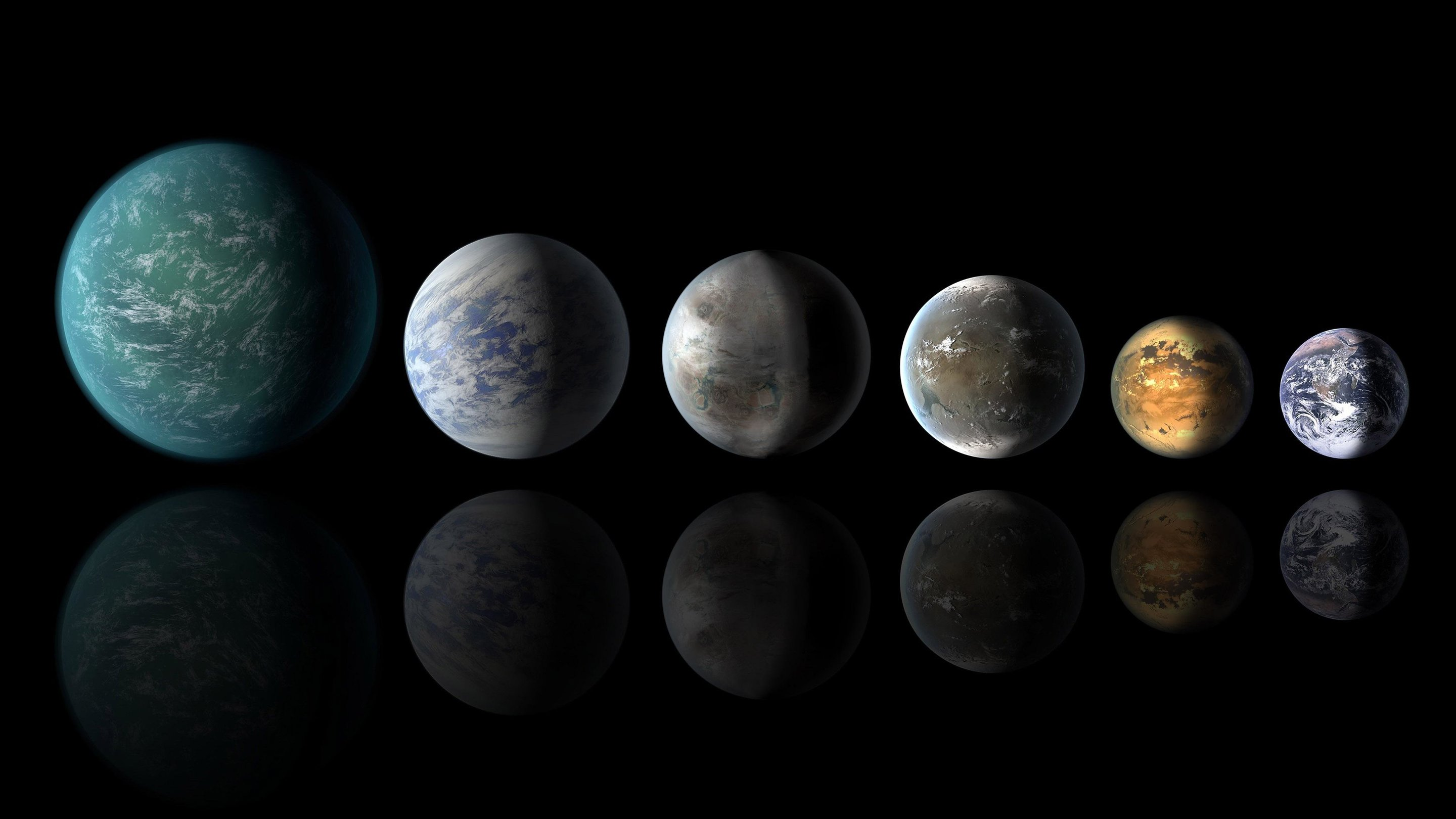
Exoplanets potentially containing water (artwork; 17 August 2018) (Left to right: Kepler-22b, Kepler-69c, Kepler-452b, Kepler-62f, Kepler-186f.)

Most known extrasolar planetary systems appear to have very different compositions compared to that of the Solar System, though there may be sample bias arising from the detection methods.

The goal of current searches is to find Earth-sized planets in the habitable zone of their planetary systems (also sometimes called the "Goldilocks zone"). Planets with oceans could include Earth-sized moons of giant planets, though it remains speculative whether such 'moons' really exist. There is speculation that rocky planets hosting water may be commonplace throughout the Milky Way.

In July 2022, water vapor was detected in the atmosphere of the exoplanet WASP-96b based on spectrum studies with the James Webb Space Telescope. In August 2022, the exoplanet TOI-1452 b was found to have a density consistent with a water-rich composition based on studies with data from the Transiting Exoplanet Survey Satellite (TESS).

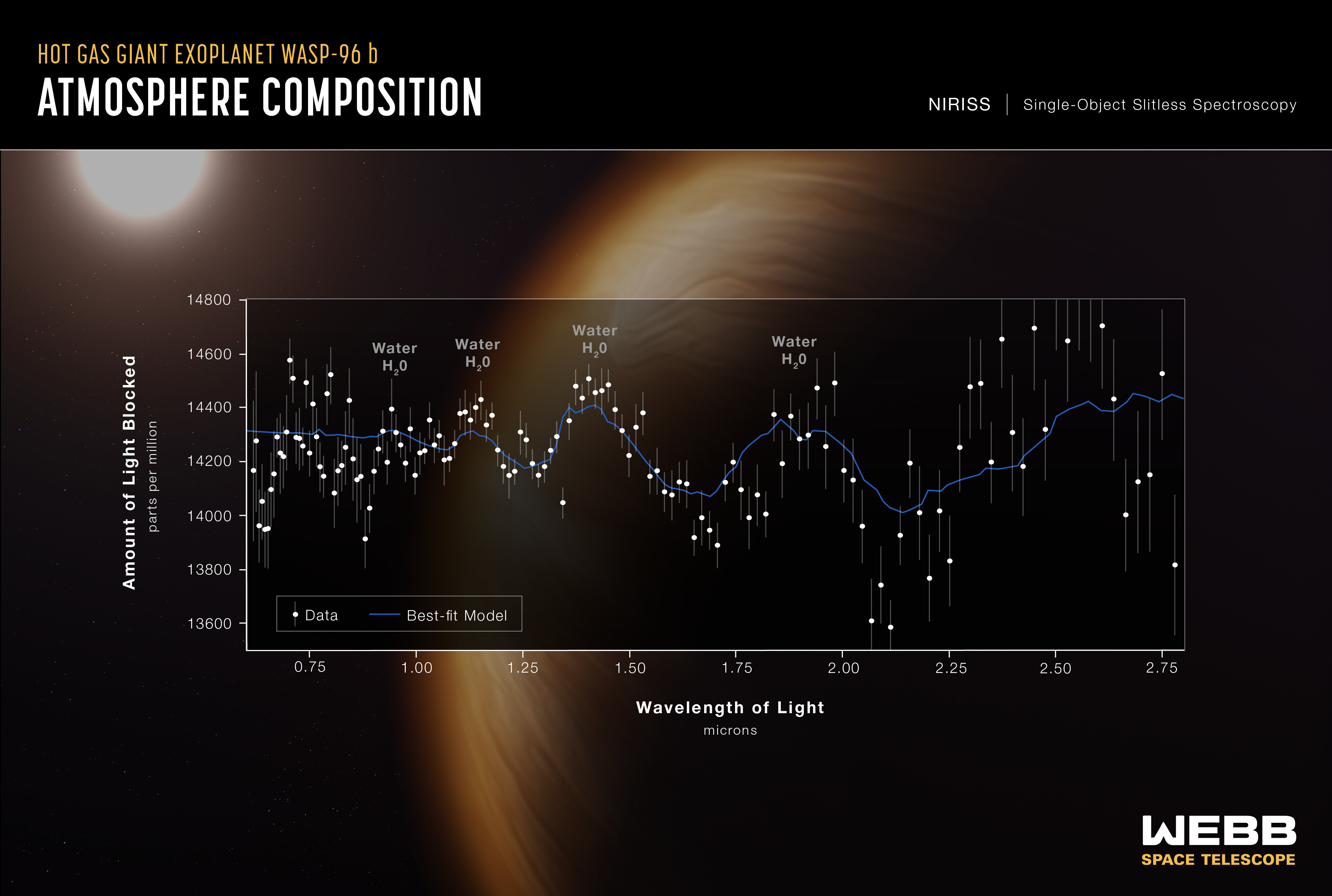
Water detected on exoplanet WASP-96b based on James Webb Space Telescope spectral studies

== See also ==
- Planetary oceanography
- Earth analog
- Water vapor § Extraterrestrial
- List of nearest terrestrial exoplanet candidates
- List of largest lakes and seas in the Solar System
- Ocean world
- Pale Blue Dot
- Planetary habitability
- Super-Earth
- Terrestrial planet
- Water on terrestrial planets of the Solar System
- APM 08279+5255, quasar with a vast amount of water

== Bibliography ==
- Aguilera Mochon, Juan Antonio (2017). El agua en el cosmos [Water in the cosmos] (in Spanish). Spain: RBA. ISBN 978-84-473-9082-3.
