= GD 61 =

Star in the constellation Perseus

Observation data Epoch J2000 Equinox ICRS
- Constellation: Perseus
- Right ascension: 04^{h} 38^{m} 39.39^{s}
- Declination: +41° 09′ 32.5″
- Apparent magnitude (V): 14.8

Characteristics
- Evolutionary stage: white dwarf
- Spectral type: DBAZ3

Details
Mass	70% M_{☉}
Temperature	17,280 K
Age	600 Myr

Other designations
- 2MASS J04383938+4109325, EGGR 315, WD 0435+41, Lan 542

Database references
SIMBAD	data

GD 61 is a white dwarf with a protoplanetary system located 150 light-years from Earth in the constellation Perseus. It is thought to have been a main-sequence star of spectral type A0V with around three times the mass of the Sun that has aged and passed through a red-giant phase, leaving a dense, hot remnant that has around 70% of the Sun's mass and a surface temperature of 17,280 K. It is thought to be around 600 million years old, including both its life as a main-sequence star and as a white dwarf. It has an apparent magnitude of 14.8. GD 61 was first noted as a potential degenerate star in 1965, in a survey of white-dwarf suspects by astronomers from the Lowell Observatory in Arizona.

In 2013, a circumstellar disk that resulted from the destruction of a water-rich asteroid was detected in close orbit around GD 61, which makes this the first detection of solid or liquid water on an extrasolar body. This asteroid would originally have been 26% water by mass, close to the water content of Ceres. This evidence suggests that a planet, with a rocky surface similar to Earth's, may have existed in the past, with the asteroid thus being an artifact from this period, now possibly part of a debris field from the hypothetical planet's breakup. Such a planet would have had both a rocky surface and water, two key ingredients for life. The researchers used the Cosmic Origins Spectrograph on the Hubble Space Telescope to determine the elemental composition. The elements magnesium, silicon, iron, and oxygen were detected, all components of rocky planets, although the levels of oxygen were much higher than what could be accounted for. The lack of associated carbon left only one candidate for the oxygen excess—water.

== See also ==
- Extraterrestrial liquid water
- 24 Themis, the first Solar System asteroid detected having liquid water
