= MWC 480 =

Star in the Taurus-Auriga star forming region of the constellation Auriga

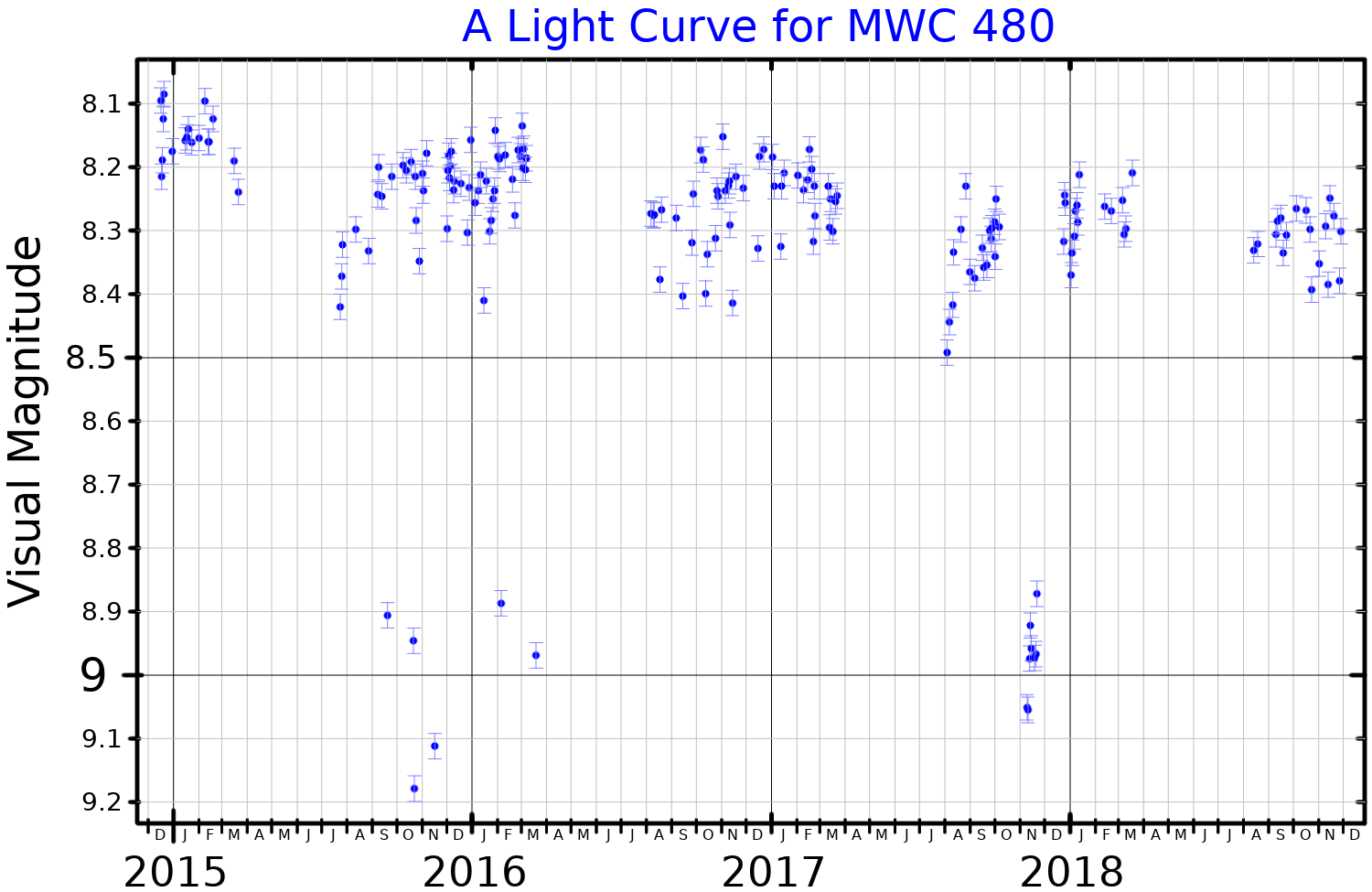
- A visual band light curve for MWC 480, plotted from ASAS-SN data

Observation data Epoch J2000 Equinox ICRS
- Constellation: Auriga
- Right ascension: 04^{h} 58^{m} 46.2656^{s}
- Declination: +29° 50′ 36.988″
- Apparent magnitude (V): 7.62

Characteristics
- Spectral type: A3psh3+
- Apparent magnitude (G): 7.65

Astrometry
Proper motion (μ)	RA: 4.661±0.051 mas/yr Dec.: −25.168±0.036 mas/yr
Parallax (π)	6.4014±0.0518 mas
Distance	510 ± 4 ly (156 ± 1 pc)
Absolute magnitude (M_{V})	+2.13

Details
Mass	1.7-2.3 M_{☉}
Radius	1.67 R_{☉}
Luminosity	11.2 L_{☉}
Temperature	8250 K
Rotational velocity (v sin i)	102.0 ± 5.0 km/s
Age	6–7.1 Myr

Other designations
- BD+29 774, HD 31648, HIP 23143, SAO 76866, GSC 01844-00503, 2MASS J04584626+2950370

Database references
SIMBAD	data

MWC 480 is a single star, about 510 light-years away in the constellation of Auriga. It is located in the Taurus-Auriga Star-Forming Region. The name refers to the Mount Wilson Catalog of B and A stars with bright hydrogen lines in their spectra. With an apparent magnitude of 7.62, it is too faint to be seen with the naked eye.

== Properties ==
Artist impression of the protoplanetary disc surrounding MWC 480.

MWC 480 is a young Herbig Ae/Be star, a class of young stars with spectral types of A or B, but are quite young and are still not main-sequence stars. MWC 480 is about 7 million years old. It is about twice the mass of the Sun, and is estimated to be about 1.67 solar radii.

MWC 480 has X-ray emissions typical of a pre-main-sequence Herbig Ae/Be star but with an order of magnitude more photoelectric absorption. It has a gas-dust envelope and is surrounded by a protoplanetary disc that is about 11% the mass of the Sun. The disc is inclined about 37° towards the line of sight, on a position angle of about 148°. Astronomers using the ALMA (Atacama Large Millimeter/submillimeter Array) have found that the protoplanetary disc surrounding MWC 480 contains large amounts of methyl cyanide (CH_{3}CN), a complex carbon-based molecule. Hydrogen cyanide (HCN) has also been detected in the disc. No signs of planet formation have yet been detected.

== Planetary system ==
In 2017, it was discovered that the brown dwarf or planet designated 2MASS J04574903+3015195 may orbit the star approximately 232,000 AU away. Later in 2021, an imaging of the gas flows in the circumstellar disk has suggested a presence of shrouded Jupiter-mass planet about 245 AU from the star.

The MWC 480 planetary system
Companion (in order from star)	Mass	Semimajor axis (AU)	Orbital period (years)	Eccentricity	Inclination (°)	Radius
b	13 M_{J}	232,165	—	—	—	2.57 R_{J}
c (unconfirmed)	1 M_{J}	245	—	—	—	—
