= Water on terrestrial planets of the Solar System =

The presence of water on the terrestrial planets of the Solar System (Mercury, Venus, Earth, Mars, and the closely related Earth's Moon) varies with each planetary body, with the exact origins remaining unclear. Additionally, the terrestrial dwarf planet Ceres is known to have water ice on its surface.

== Water inventories ==
=== Mercury ===
Due to its proximity to the Sun and lack of visible water on its surface, the planet Mercury had been thought of as a non-volatile planet. Data retrieved from the Mariner 10 mission found evidence of hydrogen (H), helium (He), and oxygen (O) in Mercury's exosphere. Volatiles have also been found near the polar regions. MESSENGER, however, sent back data from multiple on-board instruments that led scientists to the conclusion that Mercury was volatile rich. Mercury is rich in potassium (K) which has been suggested as a proxy for volatile depletion on the planetary body. This leads to assumption that Mercury could have accreted water on its surface, relative to that of Earth if its proximity had not been so near that of the Sun.

=== Venus ===
The current Venusian atmosphere has only ~200 mg/kg H_{2}O(g) in its atmosphere and the pressure and temperature regime makes water unstable on its surface. Nevertheless, assuming that early Venus's H_{2}O had a ratio between deuterium (heavy hydrogen, 2H) and hydrogen (1H) similar to Earth's Vienna Standard Mean Ocean Water (VSMOW) of 1.6×10^{−4}, the current D/H ratio in the Venusian atmosphere of 1.9×10^{−2}, at nearly ×120 of Earth's, may indicate that Venus had a much larger H_{2}O inventory. While the large disparity between terrestrial and Venusian D/H ratios makes any estimation of Venus's geologically ancient water budget difficult, its mass may have been at least 0.3% of Earth's hydrosphere. Estimates based on Venus's levels of deuterium suggest that the planet has lost anywhere from 4 metres (13 ft) of surface water up to "an Earth's ocean's worth".

=== Earth ===
Earth's hydrosphere contains ~1.46×10^{21} kg (3.22×10^{21} lb) of H_{2}O and sedimentary rocks contain ~0.21×10^{21} kg (4.6×10^{20} lb), for a total crustal inventory of ~1.67×10^{21} kg (3.68×10^{21} lb) of H_{2}O. The mantle inventory is poorly constrained in the range of 0.5×10^{21}–4×10^{21} kg (1.1×10^{21}–8.8×10^{21} lb). Therefore, the bulk inventory of H_{2}O on Earth can be conservatively estimated as 0.04% of Earth's mass (~2.3×10^{21} kg (5.1×10^{21} lb)).

==== Earth's Moon ====
Recent observations made by a number of spacecraft confirmed significant amounts of lunar water. The secondary ion mass spectrometer (SIMS) measured H_{2}O as well as other possible volatiles in lunar volcanic glass bubbles. In these volcanic glasses, 4-46 ppm by weight (wt) of H_{2}O was found and then modeled to have been 260-745 ppm wt prior to the lunar volcanic eruptions. SIMS also found lunar water in the rock samples the Apollo astronauts returned to Earth. These rock samples were tested in three different ways and all came to the same conclusion that the Moon contains water.

There are three main data sets for water abundance on the lunar surface: highland samples, KREEP samples, and pyroclastic glass samples. Highlands samples were estimated for the lunar magma ocean at 1320-5000 ppm wt of H_{2}O in the beginning. The urKREEP sample estimates a 130-240 ppm wt of H_{2}O, which is similar to the findings in the current Highland samples (before modeling). Pyroclastic glass sample beads were used to estimate the water content in the mantle source and the bulk silicate Moon. The mantle source was estimated at 110 ppm wt of H_{2}O and the bulk silicate Moon contained 100-300 ppm wt of H_{2}O.

=== Mars ===
A significant amount of surface hydrogen has been observed globally by the Mars Odyssey GRS. Stoichiometrically estimated water mass fractions indicate that—when free of carbon dioxide—the near surface at the poles consists almost entirely of water covered by a thin veneer of fine material. This is reinforced by MARSIS observations, with an estimated 1.6×10^{6} km^{3} (3.8×10^{5} cu mi) of water at the southern polar region with Water Equivalent to a Global layer (WEG) 11 metres (36 ft) deep. Additional observations at both poles suggest the total WEG to be 30 m (98 ft), while the Mars Odyssey NS observations places the lower bound at ~14 cm (5.5 in) depth. Geomorphic evidence favors significantly larger quantities of surface water over geologic history, with WEG as deep as 500 m (1,600 ft). The current atmospheric reservoir of water, though important as a conduit, is insignificant in volume with the WEG no more than 10 μm (0.00039 in). Since the typical surface pressure of the current atmosphere (~6 hPa (0.087 psi)) is less than the triple point of H_{2}O, liquid water is unstable on the surface unless present in sufficiently large volumes. Furthermore, the average global temperature is ~220 K (−53 °C; −64 °F), even below the eutectic freezing point of most brines. For comparison, the highest diurnal surface temperatures at the two MER sites have been ~290 K (17 °C; 62 °F).

== Accretion of water by Earth and Mars ==
The D/H isotopic ratio is a primary constraint on the source of H_{2}O of terrestrial planets. Comparison of the planetary D/H ratios with those of carbonaceous chondrites and comets enables a tentative determination of the source of H_{2}O. The best constraints for accreted H_{2}O are determined from non-atmospheric H_{2}O, as the D/H ratio of the atmospheric component may be subject to rapid alteration by the preferential loss of H unless it is in isotopic equilibrium with surface H_{2}O. Earth's VSMOW D/H ratio of 1.6×10^{−4} and modeling of impacts suggest that the cometary contribution to crustal water was less than 10%. However, much of the water could be derived from Mercury-sized planetary embryos that formed in the asteroid belt beyond 2.5 AU. Mars's original D/H ratio as estimated by deconvolving the atmospheric and magmatic D/H components in Martian meteorites (e.g., QUE 94201), is ×(1.9+/-0.25) the VSMOW value. The higher D/H and impact modeling (significantly different from Earth due to Mars's smaller mass) favor a model where Mars accreted a total of 6% to 27% the mass of the current Earth hydrosphere, corresponding respectively to an original D/H between ×1.6 and ×1.2 the SMOW value. The former enhancement is consistent with roughly equal asteroidal and cometary contributions, while the latter would indicate mostly asteroidal contributions. The corresponding WEG would be 0.6–2.7 km (0.37–1.68 mi), consistent with a 50% outgassing efficiency to yield ~500 m (1,600 ft) WEG of surface water. Comparing the current atmospheric D/H ratio of ×5.5 SMOW ratio with the primordial ×1.6 SMOW ratio suggests that ~50 m (160 ft) of has been lost to space via solar wind stripping.

The cometary and asteroidal delivery of water to accreting Earth and Mars has significant caveats, even though it is favored by D/H isotopic ratios. Key issues include:

1. The higher D/H ratios in Martian meteorites could be a consequence of biased sampling since Mars may have never had an effective crustal recycling process
2. Earth's Primitive upper mantle estimate of the ^{187}Os/^{188}Os isotopic ratio exceeds 0.129, significantly greater than that of carbonaceous chondrites, but similar to anhydrous ordinary chondrites. This makes it unlikely that planetary embryos compositionally similar to carbonaceous chondrites supplied water to Earth
3. Earth's atmospheric content of Ne is significantly higher than would be expected had all the rare gases and H_{2}O been accreted from planetary embryos with carbonaceous chondritic compositions.

An alternative to the cometary and asteroidal delivery of H_{2}O would be the accretion via physisorption during the formation of the terrestrial planets in the solar nebula. This would be consistent with the thermodynamic estimate of around two Earth masses of water vapor within 3AU of the solar accretionary disk, which would exceed by a factor of 40 the mass of water needed to accrete the equivalent of 50 Earth hydrospheres (the most extreme estimate of Earth's bulk H_{2}O content) per terrestrial planet. Even though much of the nebular H_{2}O(g) may be lost due to the high temperature environment of the accretionary disk, it is possible for physisorption of H_{2}O on accreting grains to retain nearly three Earth hydrospheres of H_{2}O at 500 K (227 °C; 440 °F) temperatures. This adsorption model would effectively avoid the ^{187}Os/^{188}Os isotopic ratio disparity issue of distally-sourced H_{2}O. However, the current best estimate of the nebular D/H ratio spectroscopically estimated with Jovian and Saturnian atmospheric CH_{4} is only 2.1×10^{−5}, a factor of 8 lower than Earth's VSMOW ratio. It is unclear how such a difference could exist, if physisorption were indeed the dominant form of H_{2}O accretion for Earth in particular and the terrestrial planets in general.

== See also ==
- Extraterrestrial liquid water § Liquid water in the Solar System
- Ocean world
- List of ocean worlds in the Solar System
