= Kepler-42c =

Sub-Earth orbiting Kepler-42

Kepler-42 c
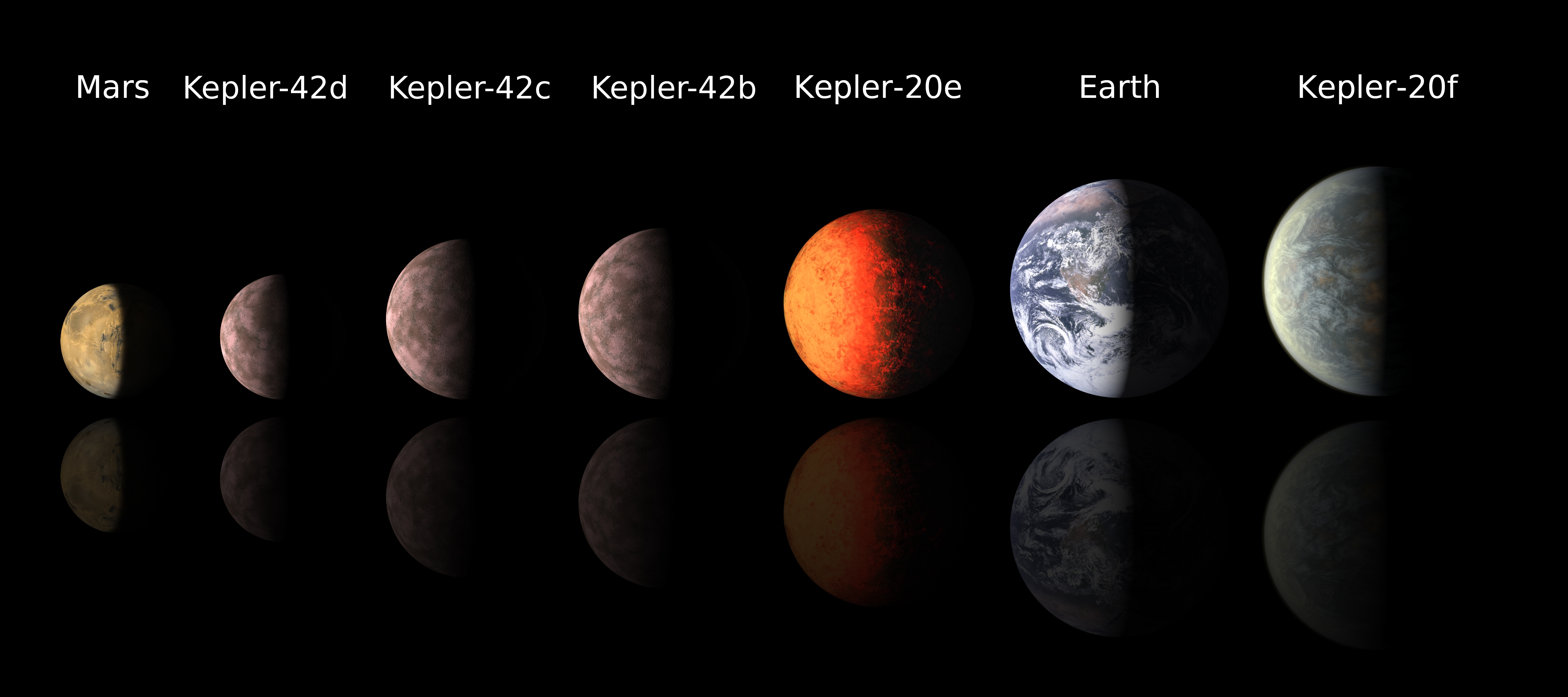
- Sizes of Earth-like planets, including Mars, Kepler-42c (KOI-961.02), Kepler-20e, Kepler-20f and Earth.

Discovery
- Discovered by: Philip S. Muirhead et al.
- Discovery site: In space
- Discovery date: January 11, 2012
- Detection method: Transit (Kepler)

Orbital characteristics
- Semi-major axis: ~ 0.0060 AU
- Orbital period (sidereal): 0.45328731±5*10^{−8} d
- Inclination: 85.06^{+0.15}_{−0.16}
- Star: Kepler-42

Physical characteristics
- Mean radius: 0.73±0.03 R_{🜨}
- Temperature: 720 ± 73

Kepler-42 c, previously KOI-961.02 then KOI-961 c, is an exoplanet orbiting Kepler-42, a star located about 131 light-years (40 pc) from the Solar System, in the constellation of Cygnus. A planetary system of at least three exoplanets with sizes between Mars and Venus has been detected around this red dwarf on January 11, 2012, by the method of transits with the help of the space telescope Kepler.

Kepler-42 c is a planet with a radius 0.73 times that of Earth. It orbits its star in a little less than 11 hours at about 0.006 AU of its host star and has an average equilibrium temperature of about 445 °C (833 °F). Due to the temperature, it is not suitable for life.

It is tidally locked in a synchronous rotation. Thus, it makes one complete rotation each time it completes an orbit. As a result, there is an eternal day side and a permanent night side.
