= Kepler-42 =

Red dwarf star in the constellation Cygnus

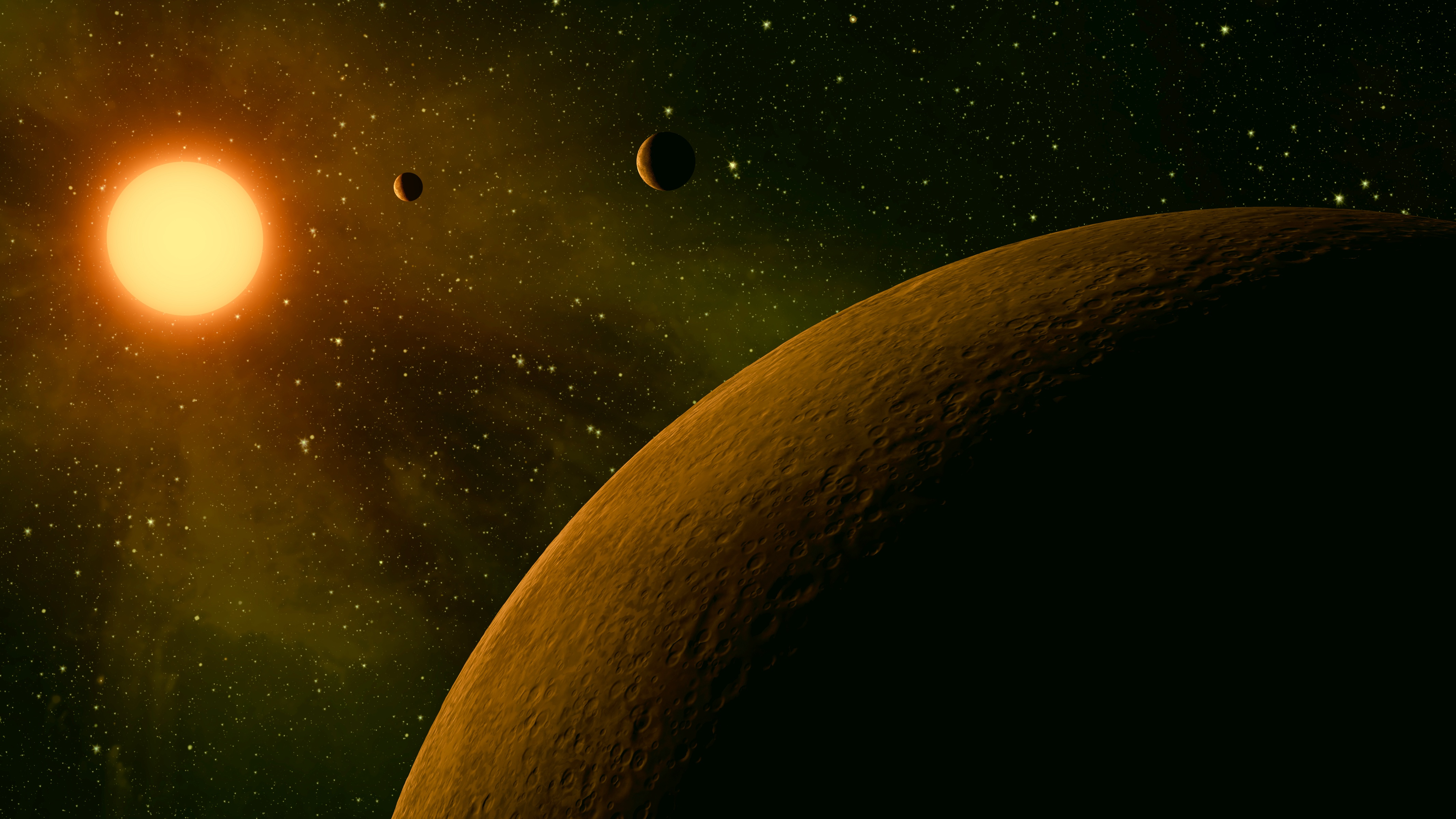
- Artist's impression of the Kepler-42 (KOI-961) system Credit: NASA

Observation data Epoch J2000 Equinox ICRS
- Constellation: Cygnus
- Right ascension: 19^{h} 28^{m} 52.5689^{s}
- Declination: 44° 37′ 08.990″
- Apparent magnitude (V): 16.12

Characteristics
- Evolutionary stage: main sequence
- Spectral type: M5V

Astrometry
| Radial velocity (R_{v}) | −84.48±0.2 km/s |
| Proper motion (μ) | RA: 93.074(24) mas/yr Dec.: −417.393(25) mas/yr |
| Parallax (π) | 24.9338±0.0204 mas |
| Distance | 130.8 ± 0.1 ly (40.11 ± 0.03 pc) |

Details
| Mass | 0.144^{+0.007}_{−0.006} M_{☉} |
| Radius | 0.175±0.006 R_{☉} |
| Luminosity | (3.08±0.28)×10^{−3} L_{☉} |
| Temperature | 3269±19 K |
| Metallicity [Fe/H] | −0.48±0.17 dex |
| Rotational velocity (v sin i) | 2.9±0.4 km/s |

Other designations
- 2MASS J19285255+4437096, KIC 8561063, LSPM J1928+4437, Gaia DR2 2126556132093765888, KOI-961

Database references
| SIMBAD | data |
| Exoplanet Archive | data |
| KIC | data |

Kepler-42, formerly known as KOI-961, is a red dwarf located in the constellation Cygnus and approximately 131 light years from the Sun. It has three known extrasolar planets, all of which are smaller than Earth in radius and orbit very close to the star.

== Characteristics ==
Kepler-42's mass is estimated to be 0.13 times that of the Sun, and a radius 0.17 times that of the Sun, just 1.7 times that of the gas giant Jupiter. Due to its small radius and hence surface area, the luminosity of Kepler-42 is only 0.24% of that of the Sun. Its metallicity is one third of the Sun's. Kepler-42 has an appreciable proper motion of up to 431±8 mas/yr. Due to its small size and low temperature, the star's habitable zone is much closer to the star than Earth is to the Sun.

== Planetary system ==
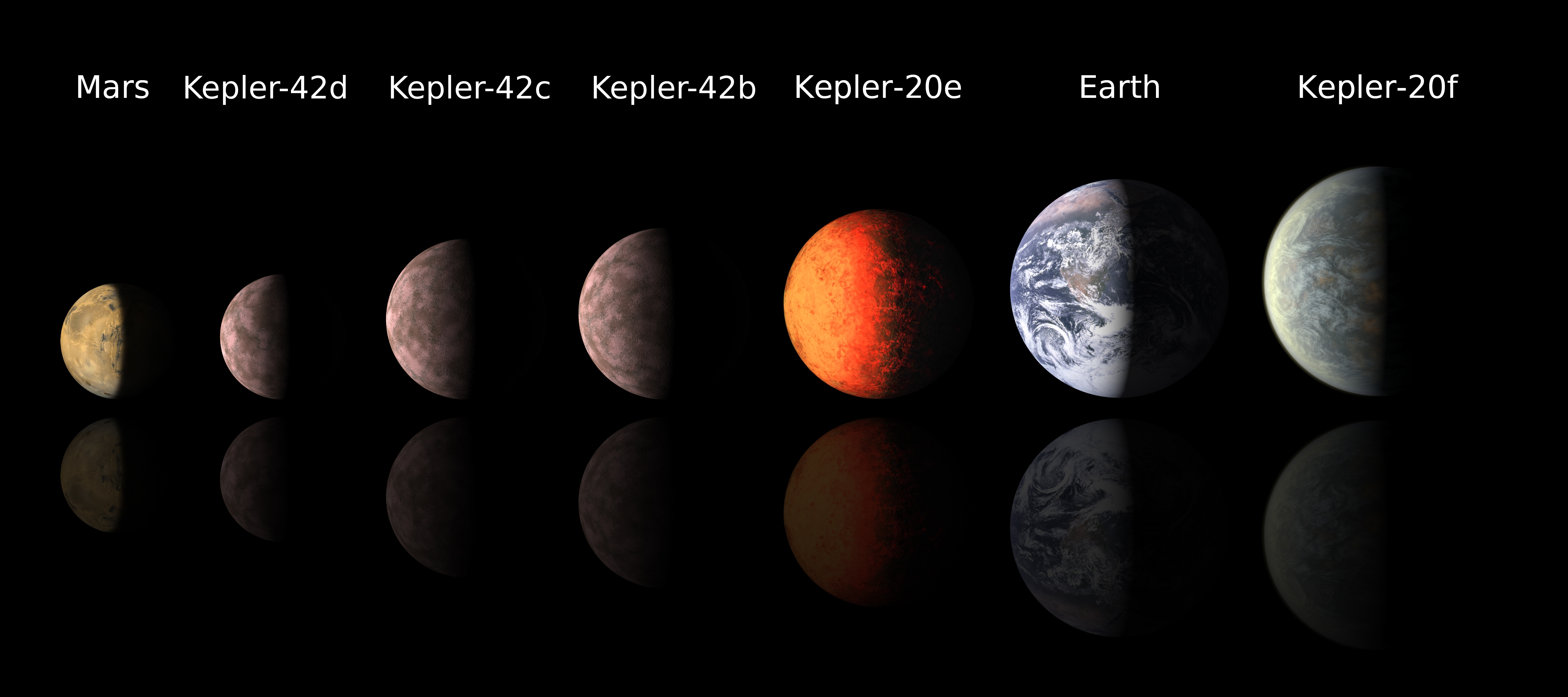
Earth, Mars and the planets of this system compared to Kepler-20e and Kepler-20f, the first terrestrial-sized exoplanets to be discovered outside of the Solar System

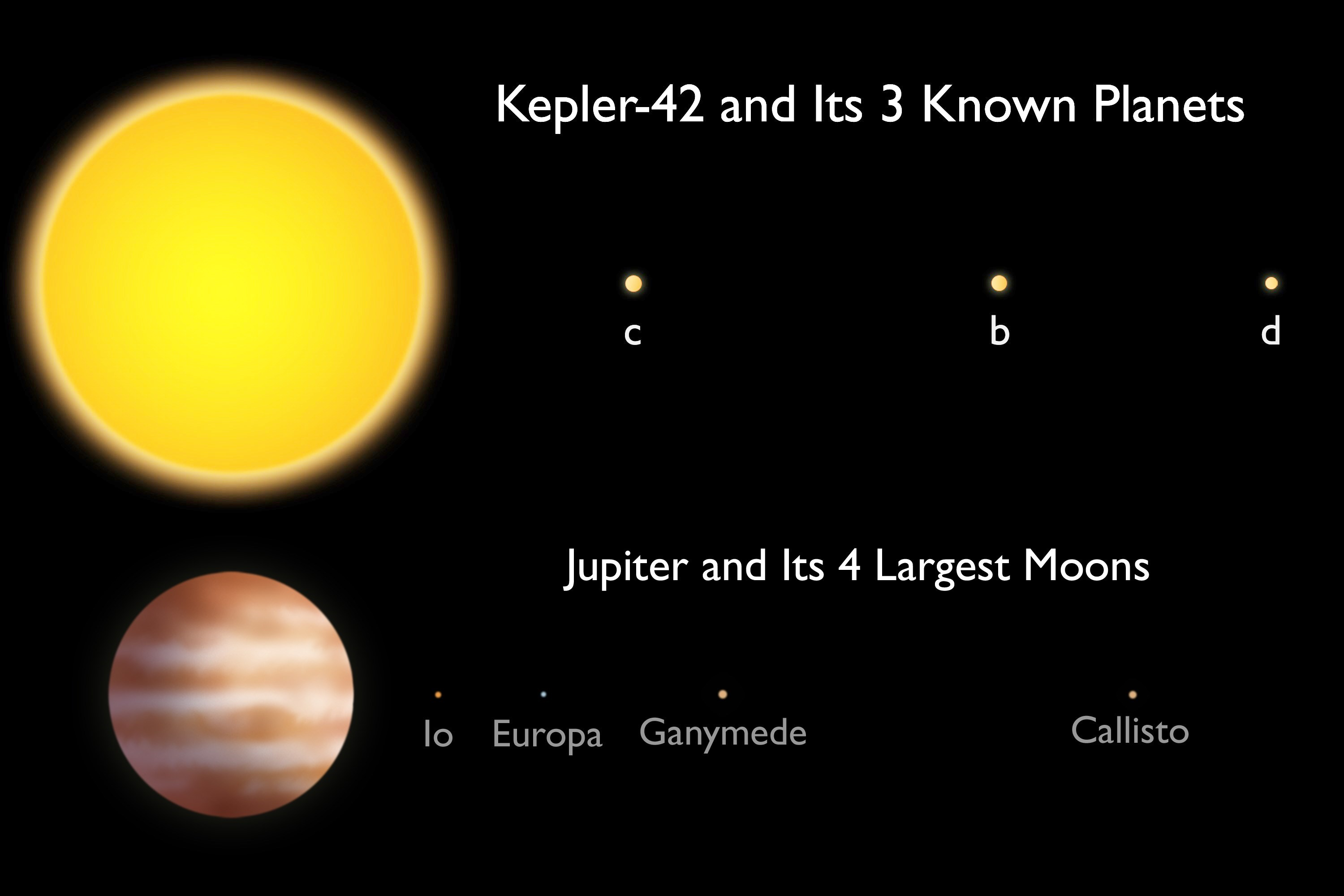
The Kepler-42 system as compared to the Jovian system (Note: Orbit sizes to scale with each other, but not to the sizes of their respective host bodies.)

The planetary system comprising three transiting planets was discovered in February 2011 and confirmed on 10 January 2012, using the Kepler Space Telescope. These planets' radii range from approximately those of Mars to Venus. The Kepler-42 system is only the second known system containing planets of Earth's radius or smaller (the first was the Kepler-20 system pictured at left). These planets' orbits are also compact, making the system (whose host star itself has a radius comparable to those of some hot Jupiters) resemble the moon systems of giant planets such as Jupiter or Saturn more than it does the Solar System. Despite these planets' small size and the star's being one of the faintest stars in Kepler field with confirmed planets, the detection of these planets was possible due to the small size of the star, causing these planets to block a larger proportion of starlight during their transits.

Not all of the orbital parameters of the system are known. For example, as with all transiting planets that have not had their properties established by means of other methods such as the radial velocity method, the orbital eccentricity remains unknown.

Based on the orbits of the planets and the luminosity and effective temperature of the host star, the equilibrium temperatures of the planets can be calculated. Assuming an extremely high albedo of 0.9 and absence of greenhouse effect, the outer planet Kepler-42 d would have an equilibrium temperature of about 280 K (7 °C), similar to Earth's 255 K (−18 °C). Estimates for the known planets are in the tables below:

| Temperature comparisons | Kepler-42c | Kepler-42b | Kepler-42d | Earth |
| Global equilibrium temperature | 728 K 455 °C; 851 °F | 524 K 251 °C; 483.8 °F | 454 K 181 °C; 357.8 °F | 255 K −18 °C −0.4 °F |
References: (Note: Temperature values for all planets assuming an albedo of 0.3, Earth's value.)

The Kepler-42 planetary system
| Companion (in order from star) | Mass | Semimajor axis (AU) | Orbital period (days) | Eccentricity | Inclination (°) | Radius |
|---|---|---|---|---|---|---|
| c | <2.06 M_{🜨} | 0.006 | 0.45328731±0.00000005 | 0 | — | 0.73±0.03 R_{🜨} |
| b | <2.73 M_{🜨} | 0.0116 | 1.21377060^{+0.00000023}_{−0.00000025} | 0 | — | 0.76±0.03 R_{🜨} |
| d | <0.9 M_{🜨} | 0.0154 | 1.86511236^{+0.00000075}_{−0.00000071} | 0 | — | 0.67^{+0.04}_{−0.03} R_{🜨} |
