= Earth-like planet =

Earth-like planet may refer to:

- Earth analog, denoting another planet that is very similar to Earth
- Habitable exoplanet, a planet that can support liquid water and thus hypothetically life.
- Terrestrial planet, denoting a planet that is composed of the same materials as Earth, i.e., primarily of silicate rocks or metals
