= Alan Boss =

American astronomer

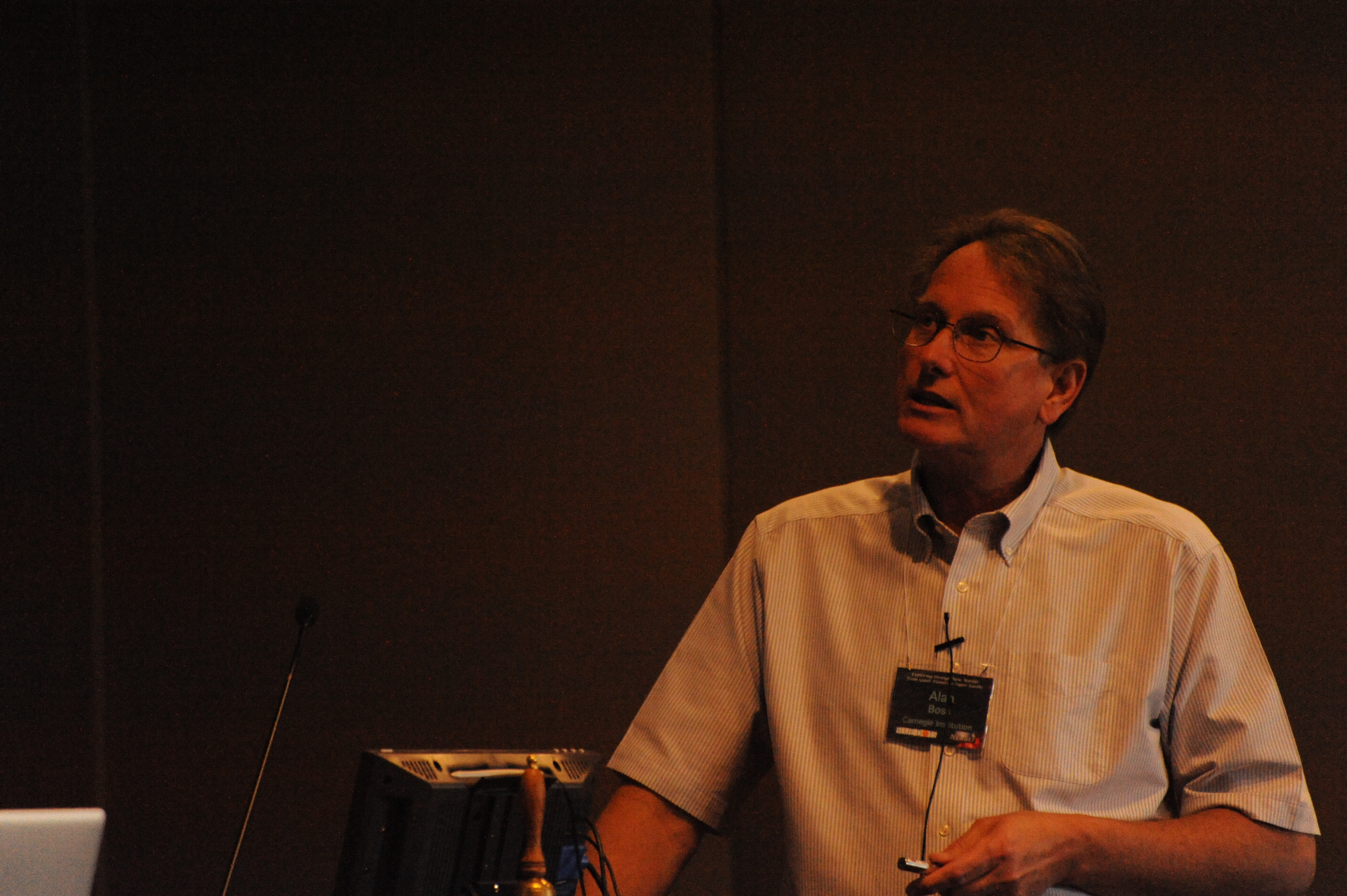
Boss in 2011

Alan P. Boss (born in Lakewood, Ohio) is a United States theoretical astrophysicist, astronomer, and planetary scientist at the Earth and Planets Laboratory of the Carnegie Institution for Science.

== Life and career ==
Educated in the Physics Departments at the University of South Florida and the University of California, Santa Barbara, Boss is a prominent scientist in stellar and planetary system formation and the study of extrasolar planets who has made highly cited contributions to the study of gas giant planet and binary star system formation. He has published hundreds of articles in these areas and related fields. He is currently a Staff Member at the Carnegie Institution for Science in the Earth and Planets Laboratory.

Boss was selected to join the NASA Science Working Group for the Kepler Mission and the NASA External Independent Readiness Board for the Exoplanet Exploration Program, both charged with the detection and characterization of nearby habitable Earth-like planets. He currently chairs the Technology Assessment Committee for NASA's Exoplanet Exoploration Program.

== Achievements ==
Boss received a NASA Group Achievement Award in 2008 for his role in the Astrobiology Roadmap. Boss is a fellow of numerous scientific academies and societies, e.g., the American Academy of Arts and Sciences, American Astronomical Society, American Association for the Advancement of Science, and the American Geophysical Union. Minor Planet (29137) is named Alanboss (1987).

== Bibliography ==
- Boss, Alan (1998). Looking for Earths: The Race to Find New Solar Systems. New York: John Wiley & Sons. ISBN 978-0-471-18421-8.
- Boss, Alan (2009). The Crowded Universe: The Search for Living Planets. Basic Books. ISBN 978-0-465-00936-7.
- Boss, Alan (2019). Universal Life: An Inside Look Behind the Race to Discover Life Beyond Earth. Oxford University Press. ISBN 978-0-190-86405-7.
