= Kepler-20d =

Hot Neptune orbiting Kepler-20

Discovery
- Discovered by: Kepler team
- Discovery date: 20 December 2011
- Detection method: Transit (Kepler Mission)

Orbital characteristics
- Semi-major axis: 0.3474 ± 0.0067 AU (51,970,000 ± 1,000,000 km)
- Eccentricity: <0.082
- Orbital period (sidereal): 77.611455(96) d
- Inclination: 89.708°+0.17° −0.053°
- Star: Kepler-20 (KOI-070)

Physical characteristics
- Mean radius: 2.606+0.053 −0.039 R_{🜨}
- Mass: 13.4+3.7 −3.6 M_{🜨}
- Mean density: 4.1+1.1 −1.2 g⋅cm^{−3}
- Temperature: 430±6 K (157 °C; 314 °F, equilibrium)

Kepler-20d is an exoplanet orbiting Kepler-20. It has a mass and radius similar to Neptune. Despite being the furthest planet from the star, it has an orbit similar to Mercury, meaning that it is a hot Neptune. Along with the other four planets in the system, Kepler-20d was announced on December 20, 2011.
