= Kepler-20 =

Star in the constellation Lyra

Observation data Epoch J2000 Equinox ICRS
- Constellation: Lyra
- Right ascension: 19^{h} 10^{m} 47.52334^{s}
- Declination: +42° 20′ 19.3014″
- Apparent magnitude (V): 12.51

Characteristics
- Evolutionary stage: main sequence
- Spectral type: G8V

Astrometry
Radial velocity (R_{v})	−21.98±0.92 km/s
Proper motion (μ)	RA: −3.869 mas/yr Dec.: −27.105 mas/yr
Parallax (π)	3.4936±0.0095 mas
Distance	934 ± 3 ly (286.2 ± 0.8 pc)

Details
Mass	0.929±0.053 M_{☉}
Radius	0.9164+0.0087 −0.0077 R_{☉}
Temperature	5495±50 K
Metallicity [Fe/H]	0.07±0.08 dex
Age	5.6+4.5 −3.5 Gyr

Other designations
- KOI-070, KIC 6850504, 2MASS J19104752+4220194, Gaia DR2 2102548708017562112.

Database references
SIMBAD	data
Exoplanet Archive	data
KIC	data

Kepler-20 is a star about 934 light-years (286 parsecs) from Earth in the constellation Lyra with a system of at least five, and possibly six, known planets. The apparent magnitude of this star is 12.51, so it cannot be seen with the unaided eye. Viewing it requires a telescope with an aperture of 15 cm (6 in) or more. It is slightly smaller than the Sun, with 94% of the Sun's radius and about 91% of the Sun's mass. The effective temperature of the photosphere is slightly cooler than that of the Sun at 5466 K, giving it the characteristic yellow hue of a stellar class G8 star. The abundance of elements other than hydrogen or helium, what astronomers term the metallicity, is approximately the same as in the Sun. It may be older than the Sun, although the margin of error here is relatively large.

== Planetary system ==
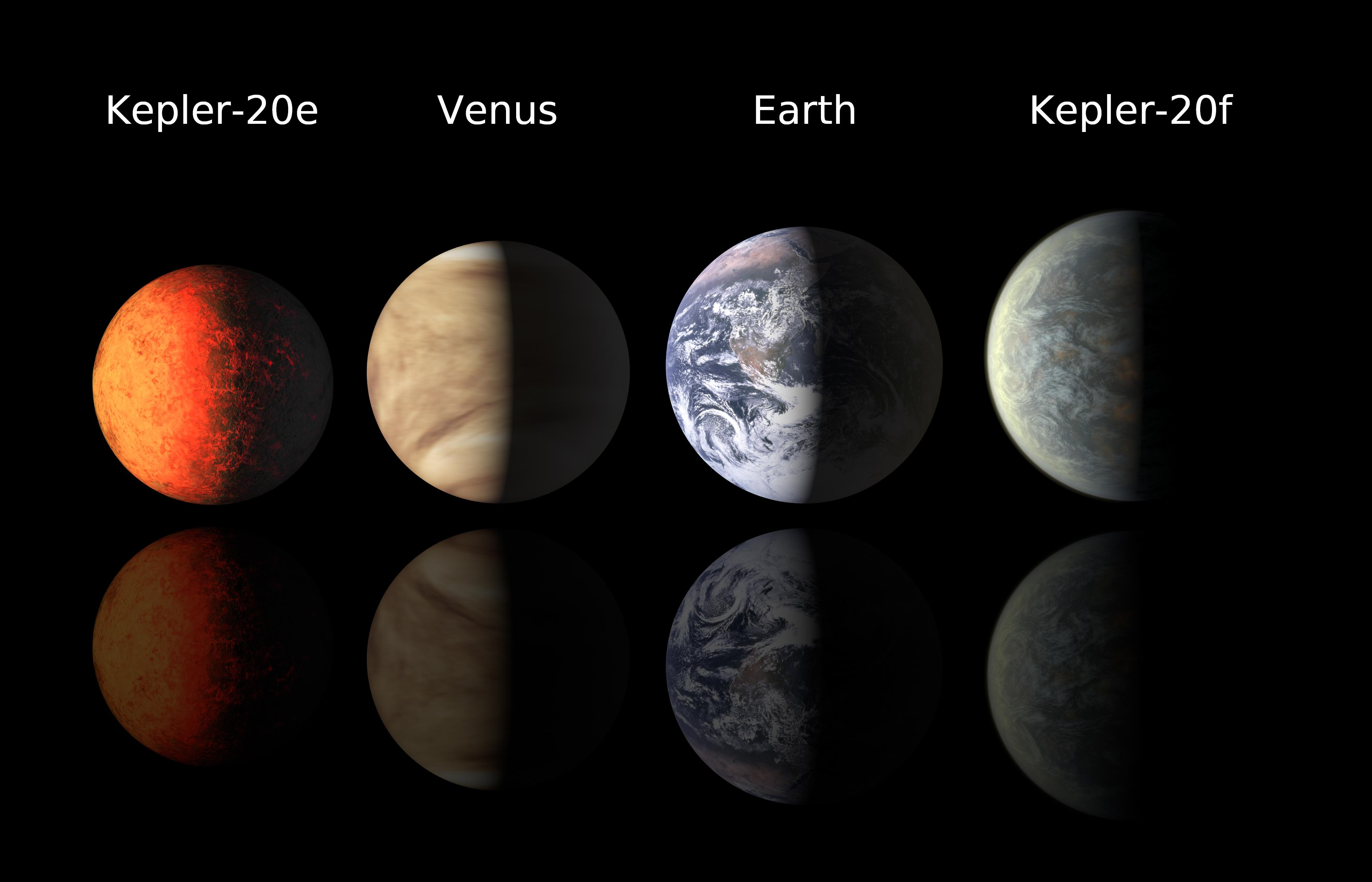
Size comparison of Kepler-20e and Kepler-20f (artist's impressions) with Venus and Earth (actual photographs)

On December 20, 2011, the Kepler Space Telescope team reported the discovery of a five-planet system containing three small gas giants and the first two Earth-sized extrasolar planets, Kepler-20e (the first known extrasolar planet smaller than Earth orbiting a main-sequence star) and Kepler-20f, orbiting a Sun-like star. Although the planets are Earth-sized, they are not Earth-like in the respect that they are much closer to their star than Earth, and are hence not near the habitable zone, with expected surface temperatures of 760 °C (1,400 °F) and 427 °C (801 °F), respectively. The three other Neptune-sized planets in the system, Kepler-20b, Kepler-20c, and Kepler-20d, all orbit similarly close to the star.

Only upper limits on the masses of e and f are known. Their masses are uncertain as they are too small to detect via radial velocity with current technology. As of 2023, Kepler-20e is known to be less massive than Earth.

A 2016 study detected a sixth planet in the system based on radial velocity observations. Kepler-20g may be a non-transiting Neptunian world. However, the existence of this planet was challenged in 2019, and a non-detection was reported in 2023. Another 2023 study listed this planet, though the data used was identical to the 2016 study except for the addition of a single data point, and the dispute was not addressed.

All planets are at small near resonances; proceeding outwards, they are 3:2, 4:2, 2:1, 4:1. The planetary orbits in current form are highly sensitive to perturbations caused by outer planets, therefore assuming stability, no additional gas giant planets can be located closer than 30 AU from the parent star.

The Kepler-20 planetary system
Companion (in order from star)	Mass	Semimajor axis (AU)	Orbital period (days)	Eccentricity	Inclination (°)	Radius
b	9.7±1.3 M_{🜨}	0.04565±0.00089	3.6961049(16)	<0.083	87.36+0.22 −1.6	1.773+0.053 −0.030 R_{🜨}
e	<0.76 M_{🜨}	0.0637±0.0012	6.0984882(99)	<0.092	87.63+1.1 −0.13	0.821±0.022 R_{🜨}
c	11.1±2.1 M_{🜨}	0.0936±0.0018	10.8540774(21)	<0.076	89.815+0.036 −0.63	2.894+0.036 −0.033 R_{🜨}
f	<1.4 M_{🜨}	0.1387±0.0027	19.578328(48)	<0.094	88.788+0.43 −0.072	0.952+0.047 −0.087 R_{🜨}
g (disputed)	≥19.96+3.08 −3.61 M_{🜨}	0.2055+0.0022 −0.0021	34.940+0.038 −0.035	≤0.16	—	—
d	13.4+3.7 −3.6 M_{🜨}	0.3474±0.0067	77.611455(96)	<0.082	89.708+0.17 −0.053	2.606+0.053 −0.039 R_{🜨}

== See also ==
- 55 Cancri
- Kepler-11
- Kepler-33
- List of multiplanetary systems
