= Kepler-20c =

Neptunian exoplanet orbiting Kepler-20

Discovery
- Discovered by: Kepler team
- Discovery date: 20 December 2011
- Detection method: Transit (Kepler Mission)

Orbital characteristics
- Semi-major axis: 0.0936 ± 0.0018 AU (14,000,000 ± 270,000 km)
- Eccentricity: <0.076
- Orbital period (sidereal): 10.8540774(21) d
- Inclination: 89.815°+0.036° −0.63°
- Star: Kepler-20 (KOI-070)

Physical characteristics
- Mean radius: 2.894+0.036 −0.033 R_{🜨}
- Mass: 11.1±2.1 M_{🜨}
- Mean density: 2.51+0.48 −0.47 g⋅cm^{−3}
- Temperature: 828±11 K (555 °C; 1,031 °F, equilibrium)

Kepler-20c is an exoplanet orbiting Kepler-20. It has a mass similar to Neptune but is slightly smaller. Despite being the third-closest planet to Kepler-20, it is still close to the star, meaning that it is a hot Neptune. Along with the other four planets in the system, Kepler-20c was announced on 20 December 2011.
