= Kepler-20b =

Mini-Neptune orbiting Kepler-20

Discovery
- Discovered by: Kepler team
- Discovery date: 20 December 2011
- Detection method: Transit (Kepler Mission)

Orbital characteristics
- Semi-major axis: 0.04537 AU
- Eccentricity: <0.32
- Orbital period (sidereal): 3.6961219 d
- Inclination: 86.50+0.36 −0.31
- Star: Kepler-20 (KOI-070)

Physical characteristics
- Mean radius: 1.868+0.066 −0.034 R_{🜨}
- Mass: 9.7+1.41 −1.44 M_{🜨}
- Mean density: 8.2+2.0 −2.7 g cm^{−3}
- Temperature: 1,014 K (741 °C; 1,366 °F)

Kepler-20b is an exoplanet orbiting Kepler-20 in a system 922 light years from Earth. It is classified as a Super-Earth, as it has a radius and mass greater than that of Earth. Its radius of about 1.87 R_{🜨} would typically mean that it is a Mini-Neptune; but its high mass of 9.7 M_{🜨} implies that it is an iron-rich rocky world. Along with the other four planets in the system, Kepler-20b was announced on 20 December 2011.
