= ESPRESSO =

Echelle spectrograph on ESO VLT, Chile

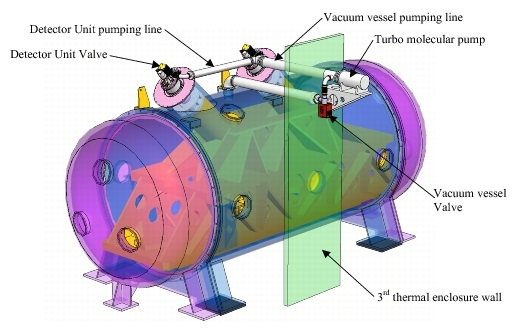
ESPRESSO spectrograph concept at the Preliminary Design Review

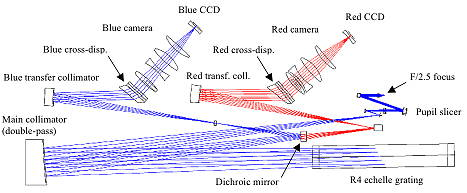
ESPRESSO spectrograph optical design at the Preliminary Design Review

ESPRESSO successfully made its first observations in November 2017.

ESPRESSO (Echelle Spectrograph for Rocky Exoplanet- and Stable Spectroscopic Observations) is a third-generation, fiber-fed, cross-dispersed, echelle spectrograph mounted on the European Southern Observatory's Very Large Telescope (VLT). The unit saw its first light with one VLT in December 2017 and first light with all four VLT units in February 2018.

ESPRESSO is the successor of a line of echelle spectrometers that include CORAVEL, Elodie, Coralie, and HARPS. It measures changes in the light spectrum with great sensitivity, and is being used to search for Earth-size rocky exoplanets via the radial velocity method. For example, Earth induces a radial-velocity variation of 9 cm/s on the Sun; this gravitational "wobble" causes minute variations in the color of sunlight, invisible to the human eye but detectable by the instrument. The telescope light is fed to the instrument, located in the VLT Combined-Coude Laboratory 70 meters away from the telescope, where the light from up to four unit telescopes of the VLT can be combined.

In 2026, a solar telescope was installed to observe our own Sun. The Paranal Solar ESPRESSO Telescope (PoET) uses a 60 cm mirror to collect light from the Sun, sending it to ESPRESSO for analysis. The telescope is capable of focusing on small features such as sun spots, and allows ESPRESSO to be used during the day, while continuing its VLT observations after sunset.

== Sensitivity ==
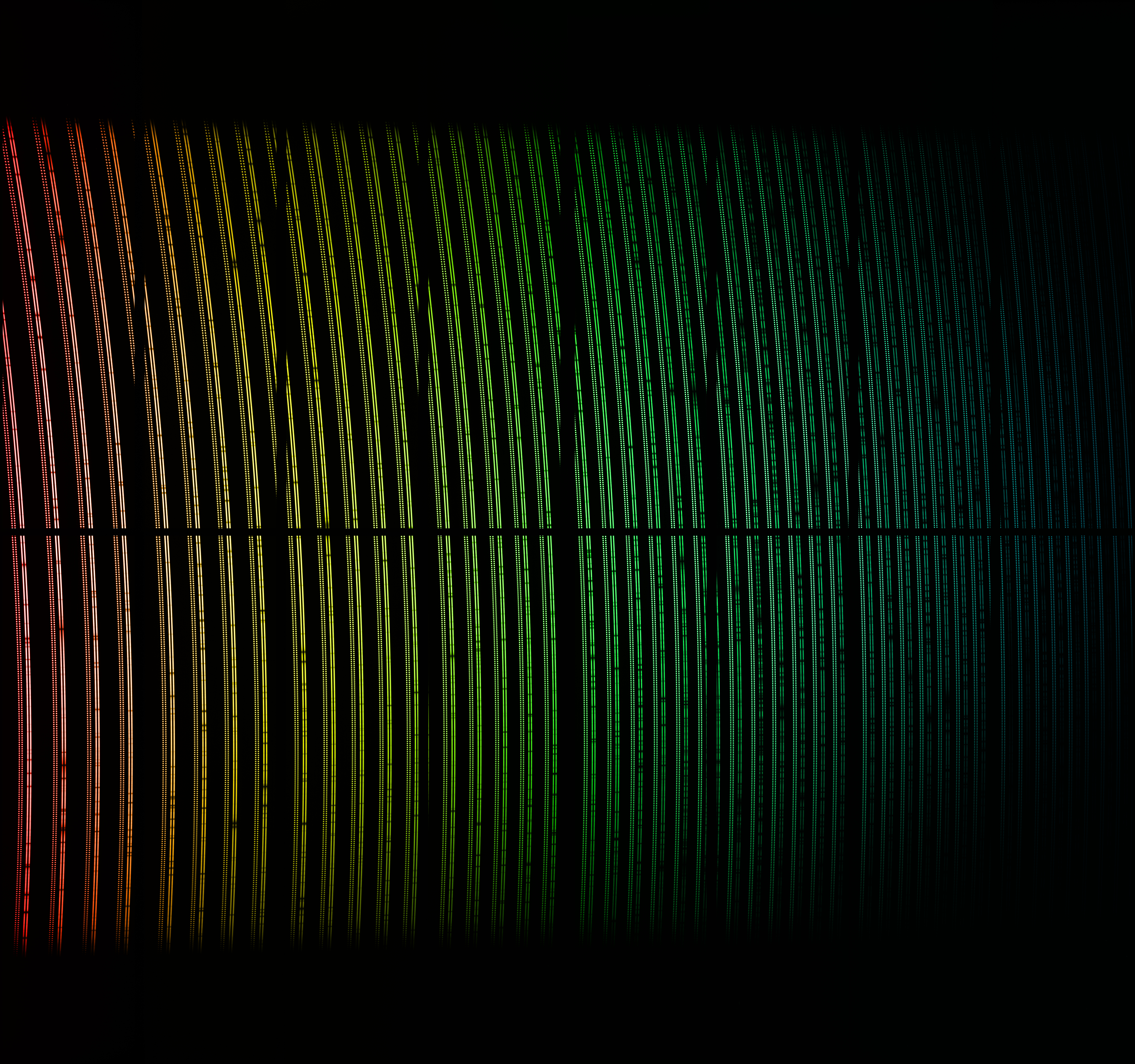
Data from ESPRESSO First Light

ESPRESSO builds on the foundations laid by the High Accuracy Radial Velocity Planet Searcher (HARPS) instrument at the 3.6-metre telescope at ESO's La Silla Observatory. ESPRESSO benefits not only from the much larger combined light-collecting capacity of the four 8.2-metre VLT Unit Telescopes, but also from improvements in the stability and calibration accuracy that are now possible by laser frequency comb technology. The requirement is to reach 10 cm/s, but the aimed goal is to obtain a precision level of a few cm/s. This would mean a large step forward over current radial-velocity spectrographs such as ESO's HARPS. The HARPS instrument can attain a precision of 97 cm/s (3.5 km/h), with an effective precision of the order of 30 cm/s. The ESPRESSO would greatly exceed this capability making detection of Earth-size planets from ground-based instruments possible. Commissioning of ESPRESSO at the VLT started late 2017.

The instrument is capable of operating in 1-UT mode (using one of the telescopes) and in 4-UT mode. In 4-UT mode, in which all the four 8-m telescopes are connected incoherently to form a 16-m equivalent telescope, the spectrograph detects extremely faint objects.

For example, for G2V type stars:

- Rocky planets around stars as faint as V ≈ 9 (in 1-UT mode)
- Neptune-mass planets around stars as faint as V ≈ 12 (in 4-UT mode )
- Earth-size rocky planets around stars as faint as V ≈ 9 (CODEX on the E-ELT)

The best-suited candidate stars for ESPRESSO are non-active, non-rotating, quiet G dwarfs to red dwarfs. It operates at the peak of its efficiency for a spectral type up to M4-type stars.

== Instrument ==
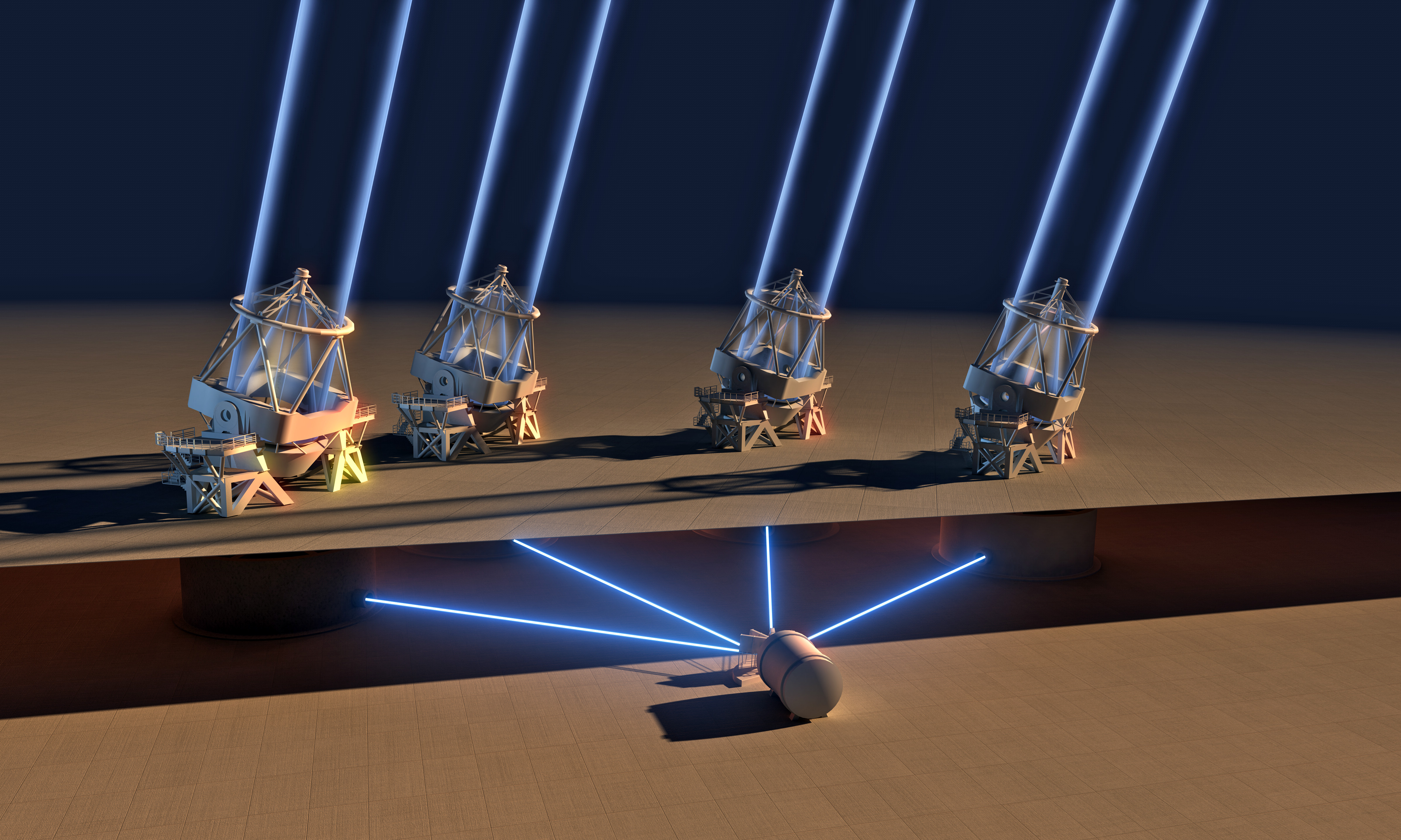
First light of the ESPRESSO instrument with all four unit telescopes

In the singleHR mode ESPRESSO can be fed by any of the four UTs.

== Status ==
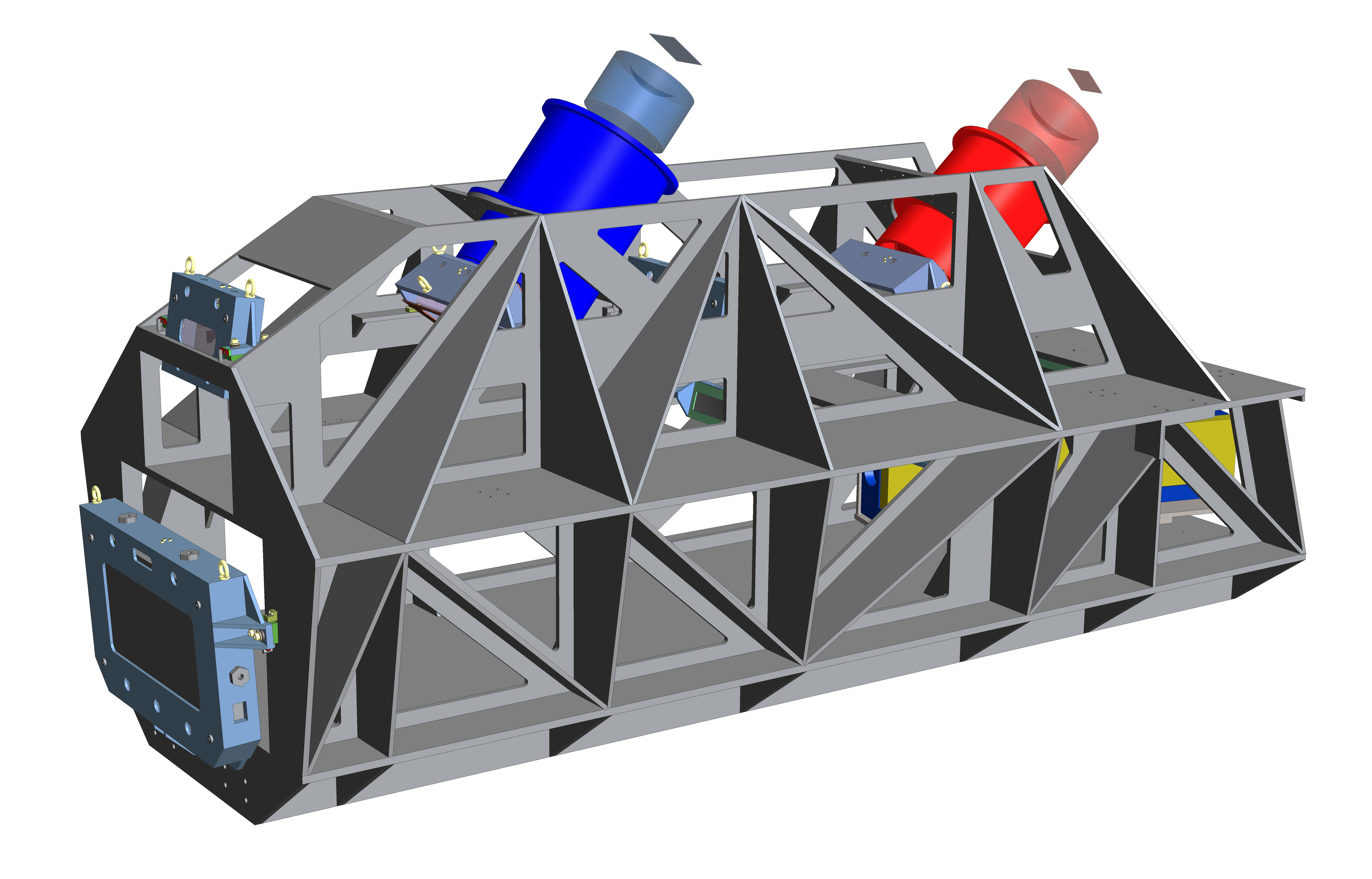
Engineering rendering of the ESPRESSO instrument

All design work was completed and finalised by April 2013, with the manufacturing phase of the project commencing thereafter. ESPRESSO was tested on June 3, 2016. ESPRESSO first light occurred on September 25, 2016, during which they spotted various objects, among them the star 60 Sgr A. After being shipped to Chile, installed at the VLT, ESPRESSO saw its first light there on 27 November 2017, in 1-UT mode, observing the star Tau Ceti; the first star observed in the 4-UT mode was on February 3, 2018.

A problem was discovered in the ESPRESSO charge-coupled device controllers, digital imaging hardware, where a differential nonlinearity issue has reduced the resolution obtainable more severely than was previously feared. The ESO detector team that determined the source of the problem is currently, as of June 2019, working on a new version of the associated hardware in order to remedy this hopefully temporary setback.

On August 29, 2019, the ESPRESSO ETC was updated to reflect the gain in transmission after the technical mission of July. This gain influx was, on average, ≈50% in the UHR and HR modes and ≈40% in the MR.

As of April 6, 2020, the red radial velocity detector has, at least for a very short time, achieved the ≈10 cm/s precision, while the blue detector has so far only managed ≈60 cm/s. Due to the limited spectral coverage and lack of reliability, the Laser Frequency Comb (LFC) is currently not integrated into the telescope and for now complete wavelength calibration will have to rely on the two backup ThAr lamps, with resultant radial velocity measurements values limited by photon noise, stellar jitter and so less precise than expected. The ESPRESSO operator and detector teams are working to characterize and correct the problem, with a dedicated mission expected to take place during 2020.

On May 24, 2020, a team led by A. Suárez Mascareño confirmed the existence of the exoplanet Proxima b, finding it to be about 1.17 times the mass of Earth—smaller than the older estimate of 1.3 times. They also suggested it is located in the habitable zone of its star, which it orbits in 11.2 days. ESPRESSO achieved an accuracy of 26 cm/s, about three times the accuracy obtained with HARPS. They also found a second signal in the data that could be of planetary origin with a semi-amplitude of only 40 cm/s and a 5.15-day period.

On August 28, 2020, it was announced that in the coming weeks minimal science operations are planned to be resumed at the Paranal Observatory, following after a five-month suspension due to the COVID-19 pandemic.

As of June 11, 2021, there is still an ongoing issue with the blue cryostat detector caused by temperature instabilities, and there has been a communication problem between the Atmospheric Dispersion Corrector and the rest of the instrument, these issues are currently reducing the detection resolution achievable with the instrument.

A major instrument intervention was scheduled between May 1 and May 16, 2022, and the instrument will be out of operations between May 1 until around May 23. After the intervention, an improvement in the overall instrument performance, and in the radial velocity stability, particularly in the blue detector, is expected.

As a result of the instrument intervention the blue cryostat stability has dramatically improved. However, because of a change of the cross dispersion and dispersion direction positions (in both the x and y direction) from the red and blue cryostat detectors induced by the instrument intervention, combining data from different pixels to produce a focused image has become problematic in the MR4x2 mode and the new HR4x2 mode. This problem should be fixed in the new pipeline version, i.e. in an upcoming software update.

== Scientific objectives ==
The main scientific objectives for ESPRESSO are:

- The measurement of high precision radial velocities of solar type stars for the search for rocky planets in the habitable zone of their star.
- The measurement of the variation of the physical constants
- The analysis of the chemical composition of stars in nearby galaxies.

== Consortium ==
ESPRESSO was developed by a consortium consisting on the European Southern Observatory (ESO) and seven scientific institutes:

- Centre for Astrophysics of the University of Porto (Portugal)
- Faculdade de Ciências da Universidade de Lisboa, CAAUL & LOLS (Portugal)
- Trieste Astronomical Observatory (Italy)
- Brera Astronomical Observatory (Italy)
- Instituto de Astrofísica de Canarias (Spain)
- Physics Institute of the University of Bern (Switzerland)
- University of Geneva (Switzerland)
- Institute of Astrophysics and Space Sciences (Portugal)

The principal investigator is Francesco Pepe.

== ESPRESSO specifications ==
	ESPRESSO
Telescope	VLT (8 m)
Scope	Rocky planets
Sky aperture	4 arcsec
R	≈200.000
λ coverage	380–686 nm
λ precision	5 m/s
RV stability	< 10 cm/s
	4-VLT mode (D = 16 m) with RV = 1 m/s

== Radial velocity comparison tables ==
Planet Mass	Distance AU	Radial velocity (v_{radial})	Note
Jupiter	1	28.4 m/s	
Jupiter	5	12.7 m/s	
Neptune	0.1	4.8 m/s	
Neptune	1	1.5 m/s	
Super-Earth (5 M_{🜨})	0.1	1.4 m/s	
Super-Earth (5 M_{🜨})	1	0.45 m/s	
Earth	0.09	0.30 m/s	
Earth	1	0.09 m/s	
Source: Luca Pasquini, power-point presentation, 2009 Notes: (1) Most precise v_{radial} measurements ever recorded. ESO's HARPS spectrograph was used.

Planets
Planet	Planet Type	Semimajor axis (AU)	Orbital period	Radial velocity (m/s)	Detectable by:
Dimidium	Hot Jupiter	0.05	4.23 days	55.9	First-generation spectrograph
Lipperhey	Gas giant	5.77	14.29 years	45.2	First-generation spectrograph
Jupiter	Gas giant	5.20	11.86 years	12.4	First-generation spectrograph
Gliese 581c	Super-Earth	0.07	12.92 days	3.18	Second-generation spectrograph
Saturn	Gas giant	9.58	29.46 years	2.75	Second-generation spectrograph
Proxima Centauri b	Habitable planet (potentially)	0.05	11.19 days	1.38	Second-generation spectrograph
Neptune	Ice giant	30.10	164.79 years	0.281	Third-generation spectrograph
Earth	Habitable planet	1.00	365.26 days	0.089	Third-generation spectrograph (likely)
Pluto	Dwarf planet	39.26	246.04 years	0.00003	Not detectable

=== MK-type stars with planets in the habitable zone ===
Stellar mass (M_{☉})	Planetary mass (M_{🜨})	Lum. (L_{0})	Type	RHAB (AU)	RV (cm/s)	Period (days)
0.10	1.0	8×10^{−4}	M8	0.028	168	6
0.21	1.0	7.9×10^{−3}	M5	0.089	65	21
0.47	1.0	6.3×10^{−2}	M0	0.25	26	67
0.65	1.0	1.6×10^{−1}	K5	0.40	18	115
0.78	2.0	4.0×10^{−1}	K0	0.63	25	209

== See also ==
- CORALIE spectrograph
- Doppler spectroscopy
- ELODIE spectrograph
- EXPRES spectrograph
- HIRES spectrograph
- Lists of planets
- SOPHIE échelle spectrograph
