= HD 121504 b =

Extrasolar planet in the constellation Centaurus

Discovery
- Discovered by: Mayor et al.
- Discovery site: La Silla Observatory
- Discovery date: August 7, 2000
- Detection method: Radial velocity (CORALIE)

Designations
- Alternative names: HIP 68162 b

Orbital characteristics
- Apastron: 0.34 au (51 million km)
- Periastron: 0.32 au (48 million km)
- Semi-major axis: 0.33 au (49 million km)
- Eccentricity: 0.03 ± 0.01
- Orbital period (sidereal): 63.33 ± 0.03 d 0.1734 year
- Angular distance: 7 mas
- Longitude of periastron: 265° ± 12°
- Time of periastron: 2,451,450 ± 2 JD
- Semi-amplitude: 50.8 ± 0.9 m/s
- Star: HD 121504

Physical characteristics
- Mass: >1.22 M_{J} >388 M_{E}

HD 121504 b is an exoplanet that is likely to be slightly less massive than Jupiter. Although the radial velocity method that was used to detect the planet can only measure the minimum mass of the planet, it is very unlikely that its true mass would be much higher.

HD 121504 b orbits the star at a distance of about one third of Earth's distance from the Sun, and has a slightly eccentric orbit.
