= Geneva Extrasolar Planet Search =

The Geneva Extrasolar Planet Search is a variety of observational programs run by the Geneva Observatory at Versoix, a small town near Geneva, Switzerland. The programs are executed by M. Mayor, D. Naef, F. Pepe, D. Queloz, N.C. Santos, and S. Udry using several telescopes and instruments in the Northern and Southern Hemisphere and have resulted in the discovery of numerous extrasolar planets, including 51 Pegasi b, the first ever confirmed exoplanet orbiting a main-sequence star.

Programs originated at Geneva are generally conducted in collaboration with several other academic institutions from Belgium, Germany, Italy and the United Kingdom. These programs search for exoplanets in various locations using different instruments. These include the Haute-Provence Observatory in France, the TRAPPIST and the Euler Telescope, both located at La Silla Observatory in Chile, as well as the M dwarf programs. Most recent projects involve the HARPS spectrograph, HARPS-N at the island of La Palma, and the Next-Generation Transit Survey located at the Paranal Observatory, northern Chile.

The Integral Science Data Centre is located at Ecogia, which also belongs to the town of Versoix. The centre is linked to the Geneva Observatory and deals with the processing of the data provided by the satellite INTEGRAL of the European Space Agency. On the two sites of Sauverny and Ecogia, a group of approximately 143 people are employed, including scientists, PhD candidates, students, technical staff (computer and electronics specialists, mechanics), as well as administrative staff.

== Extrasolar planet search surveys ==
- The ELODIE Northern Extrasolar Planet Search based at the Haute-Provence Observatory in France.
- The CORALIE Survey for Southern Extra-solar Planets based at the La Silla Observatory in Chile.

== See also ==
- Anglo-Australian Planet Search is another group searching the southern hemisphere for planets.
- List of extrasolar planets
