= Hubelmatt Observatory =

Sternwarte Hubelmatt
- Alternative names: Sternwarte Hubelmatt
- Location: Lucerne, Canton of Lucerne, Switzerland.
- Coordinates: 47.0351°N 8.3056°E
- Established: 1979
- Website: sternwarteluzern.ch
- Related media on Commons

Hubelmatt Observatory (German: Sternwarte Hubelmatt) is an astronomical observatory in Lucerne, Switzerland, billeted at the city's Hubelmatt West School. Built in 1979, it is operated by the Astronomical Society of Lucerne (German: Astronomische Gesellschaft Luzern).

On 12 February 2017, the inner main-belt asteroid 6126 Hubelmatt, discovered by Zdeňka Vávrová at Kleť Observatory, was named in honor of the observatory and its hosting school. (M.P.C. 103029). This was an additional reward for suggesting the winning names "Helvetios" and "Dimidium" for 51 Pegasi and its exoplanet, respectively, as part of the 2015 NameExoWorlds contest.
