= HD 330075 b =

Extrasolar planet in the constellation Norma

Discovery
- Discovered by: Pepe et al.
- Discovery site: La Silla Observatory, Chile
- Discovery date: February 10, 2004
- Detection method: Radial velocity

Orbital characteristics
- Apastron: 0.043 AU (6.4 million km)
- Periastron: 0.043 AU (6.4 million km)
- Semi-major axis: 0.043 AU (6.4 million km)
- Eccentricity: 0
- Orbital period (sidereal): 3.369 ± 0.004 d 0.009224 y
- Time of periastron: 2,452,878.698 ± 0.032
- Argument of periastron: 0
- Semi-amplitude: 107 ± 0.7
- Star: HD 330075

HD 330075 b is an extrasolar planet approximately 164 light-years away in the constellation of Norma. This planet orbits the star HD 330075. It was discovered by the Geneva Extrasolar Planet Search team at ESO's La Silla Observatory using the HARPS spectrograph.

The planet has a mass about three quarters that of Jupiter. Its orbital distance from the star is less than 1/23rd Earth's distance from the Sun, which makes HD 330075 b an example of a hot Jupiter. One orbit around the star takes a little more than three Earth days to complete, as compared to one year for the Earth around the Sun.
