= HD 171028 b =

Exoplanet

Discovery
- Discovered by: Santos et al.
- Discovery date: July 13, 2007
- Detection method: Doppler spectroscopy

Orbital characteristics
- Apastron: 2.08 AU (311,000,000 km)
- Periastron: 0.50 AU (75,000,000 km)
- Semi-major axis: 1.29 AU (193,000,000 km)
- Eccentricity: 0.61
- Orbital period (sidereal): 538±2 d 1.47 y
- Average orbital speed: 26.2
- Time of periastron: 2453648.92±1.89
- Argument of periastron: 305±1
- Semi-amplitude: ?
- Star: HD 171028

Physical characteristics
- Mass: >1.83 M_{J}

HD 171028 b is a >1.83 M_{J} exoplanet orbiting very eccentrically around HD 171028. The period is 1.47 years and semi-major axis of 1.29 AU. The Geneva Extrasolar Planet Search team announced the discovery of planet on July 13, 2007.
