= HD 121504 =

Yellow dwarf star in the constellation Centaurus

Observation data Epoch J2000 Equinox ICRS
- Constellation: Centaurus
- Right ascension: 13^{h} 57^{m} 17.239^{s}
- Declination: −56° 02′ 24.16″
- Apparent magnitude (V): 7.54

Characteristics
- Spectral type: G2V
- B−V color index: 0.593±0.002

Astrometry
Radial velocity (R_{v})	19.603±0.0004 km/s
Proper motion (μ)	RA: −249.354 mas/yr Dec.: −84.570 mas/yr
Parallax (π)	24.0593±0.0269 mas
Distance	135.6 ± 0.2 ly (41.56 ± 0.05 pc)
Absolute magnitude (M_{V})	4.27

Details
Mass	1.16±0.02 M_{☉}
Radius	1.15±0.03 R_{☉}
Luminosity	1.62±0.04 L_{☉}
Surface gravity (log g)	4.38±0.03 cgs
Temperature	6,089±47 K
Metallicity [Fe/H]	0.16 dex
Rotation	8.6 days
Rotational velocity (v sin i)	2.6 km/s
Age	1.9±1.0 Gyr

Other designations
- CD−55°5427, GC 18842, HD 121504, HIP 68162, SAO 241321, WDS J13573-5602A, LTT 5432, NLTT 35734

Database references
SIMBAD	data
Exoplanet Archive	data

HD 121504 is a star with an orbiting exoplanet in the southern constellation of Centaurus. It is located at a distance of 136 light years from the Sun based on parallax measurements, and is drifting further away with a radial velocity of 19.6 km/s. With an apparent visual magnitude of 7.54, this star is too faint to be visible to the naked eye. It shows a high proper motion, traversing the celestial sphere at an angular rate of 0.270 arcsec yr^{−1}.

The spectrum of this star presents as an ordinary G-type main-sequence star, a yellow dwarf similar in appearance to the Sun, having a stellar classification of G2V. It is roughly two billion years old and is spinning with a rotation period of 8.6 days. The star has 16% more mass than the Sun and a 15% greater radius. The metallicity (the abundance of elements more massive than helium) is higher than solar. The star is radiating 162% of the luminosity of the Sun from its photosphere at an effective temperature of 6,089 K.

A nearby visual companion, designated as SAO 241323 has been proposed as a component of the system. However, the pair form an optical binary with an angular separation of 34.2″, and in reality this is a white giant star located thousands of light years away.

== Exoplanet ==
In 2000 the Geneva Extrasolar Planet Search Team announced the discovery of an extrasolar planet orbiting the star.

The HD 121504 planetary system
Companion (in order from star)	Mass	Semimajor axis (AU)	Orbital period (days)	Eccentricity	Inclination (°)	Radius
b	>1.22 M_{J}	0.33	63.33 ± 0.03	0.03 ± 0.01	—	—

== See also ==
- List of extrasolar planets
