= HD 330075 =

Star in the constellation Norma

Observation data Epoch J2000.0 Equinox J2000.0
- Constellation: Norma
- Right ascension: 15^{h} 49^{m} 37.69382^{s}
- Declination: −49° 57′ 48.6771″
- Apparent magnitude (V): 9.36

Characteristics
- Evolutionary stage: main sequence
- Spectral type: G5
- B−V color index: 0.935±0.005

Astrometry
| Radial velocity (R_{v}) | 61.67±0.24 km/s |
| Proper motion (μ) | RA: −232.760 mas/yr Dec.: −92.540 mas/yr |
| Parallax (π) | 22.0467±0.0443 mas |
| Distance | 147.9 ± 0.3 ly (45.36 ± 0.09 pc) |
| Absolute magnitude (M_{V}) | 5.89 |

Details
| Mass | 0.86±0.02 M_{☉} |
| Radius | 0.85+0.02 −0.03 R_{☉} |
| Luminosity | 0.393±0.001 L_{☉} |
| Surface gravity (log g) | 4.68±0.09 cgs |
| Temperature | 4,967+88 −65 K |
| Metallicity [Fe/H] | 0.18±0.04 dex |
| Age | 5.30±4.22 Gyr |

Other designations
- CD−49°10033, HD 330075, HIP 77517, SAO 226248, PPM 321068, LTT 6312, NLTT 41237, 2MASS J15493770-4957486, Gaia DR2 5982775854377691136

Database references
| SIMBAD | data |

HD 330075 is a star in the southern constellation of Norma. It has a yellow hue and an apparent visual magnitude of 9.36, which makes it too faint to be seen with the naked eye – it is visible only with telescope or powerful binoculars. Parallax measurements provide a distance estimate of 148 light years from the Sun, and it is drifting further away with a radial velocity of 62 km/s. The star is estimated to have come as close as 111.5 light-years some 409 million years ago.

This object appears to be a slightly evolved dwarf with a spectral class of G5. That is, it is nearing the end of its main sequence lifetimes and is becoming a subgiant star. The star has very low chromospheric activity and is around five billion years old. It is smaller than the Sun with 86% of the Sun's mass and 85% of the solar radius. As a consequence, it is radiating just 39% of the luminosity of the Sun from its photosphere at an effective temperature of 4,967 K. It has a super-solar metallicity, which means the abundance of elements other than hydrogen and helium appears much higher than in the Sun.

== Planetary system ==
In 2004, the discovery of a hot Jupiter planet orbiting close to the star was announced. This is the first planet discovered by the then-new HARPS spectrograph.

The HD 330075 planetary system
| Companion (in order from star) | Mass | Semimajor axis (AU) | Orbital period (days) | Eccentricity | Inclination (°) | Radius |
|---|---|---|---|---|---|---|
| b | ≥ 0.76 M_{J} | 0.043 | 3.369±0.004 | 0 | — | — |

== See also ==
- List of stars with extrasolar planets
