= SOPHIE échelle spectrograph =

French astronomical instrument

The SOPHIE (Spectrographe pour l’Observation des Phénomènes des Intérieurs stellaires et des Exoplanètes, literally meaning "spectrograph for the observation of the phenomena of the stellar interiors and of the exoplanets") échelle spectrograph is a high-resolution echelle spectrograph installed on the 1.93m reflector telescope at the Haute-Provence Observatory located in south-eastern France. The purpose of this instrument is asteroseismology and extrasolar planet detection by the radial velocity method. It builds upon and replaces the older ELODIE spectrograph. This instrument was made available for use by the general astronomical community October 2006.

== Characteristics ==
The electromagnetic spectrum wavelength range is from 387.2 to 694.3 nanometers. The spectrograph is fed from the Cassegrain focus through either one of two separate optical fiber sets, yielding two different spectral resolutions (HE and HR modes). The instrument is entirely computer-controlled. A standard data reduction pipeline automatically processes the data upon every CCD readout cycle.

HR mode is the high resolution mode. This mode incorporates a 40 micrometre exit slit to achieve high spectral resolution of R = 75000.

HE mode is the high efficiency mode. This mode is used when a higher throughput is desired particularly in the case of faint objects spectral resolution is set to R = 40000.

The R2 échelle diffraction grating has 52.65 grooves per millimeter and was manufactured by Richardson Gratings. It is blazed at 65° and its size is 20.4 cm x 40.8 cm. It is mounted in a fixed configuration. The spectrum is projected onto the E2V Technologies type 44-82 CCD detector of 4096 x 2048 pixels kept at a constant temperature of –100 °C. This grating yields 41 spectral orders, of which 39 are currently extracted, to obtain wavelengths between 387.2 nm and 694.3 nm.

== Performance ==
In HE mode, a signal-to-noise ratio (per pixel) of 27 was reached in 90 min for an object of magnitude 14.5 in the V band.

The stability of the instrument can be described by the lowest dispersion possible for radial velocity observations, in m/s. In HR mode the short term stability has been measured to be 1.3 m/s, while it is 2 m/s for longer timescales.

== See also ==
- CORALIE spectrograph
- HARPS spectrograph
