= Haute-Provence Observatory =

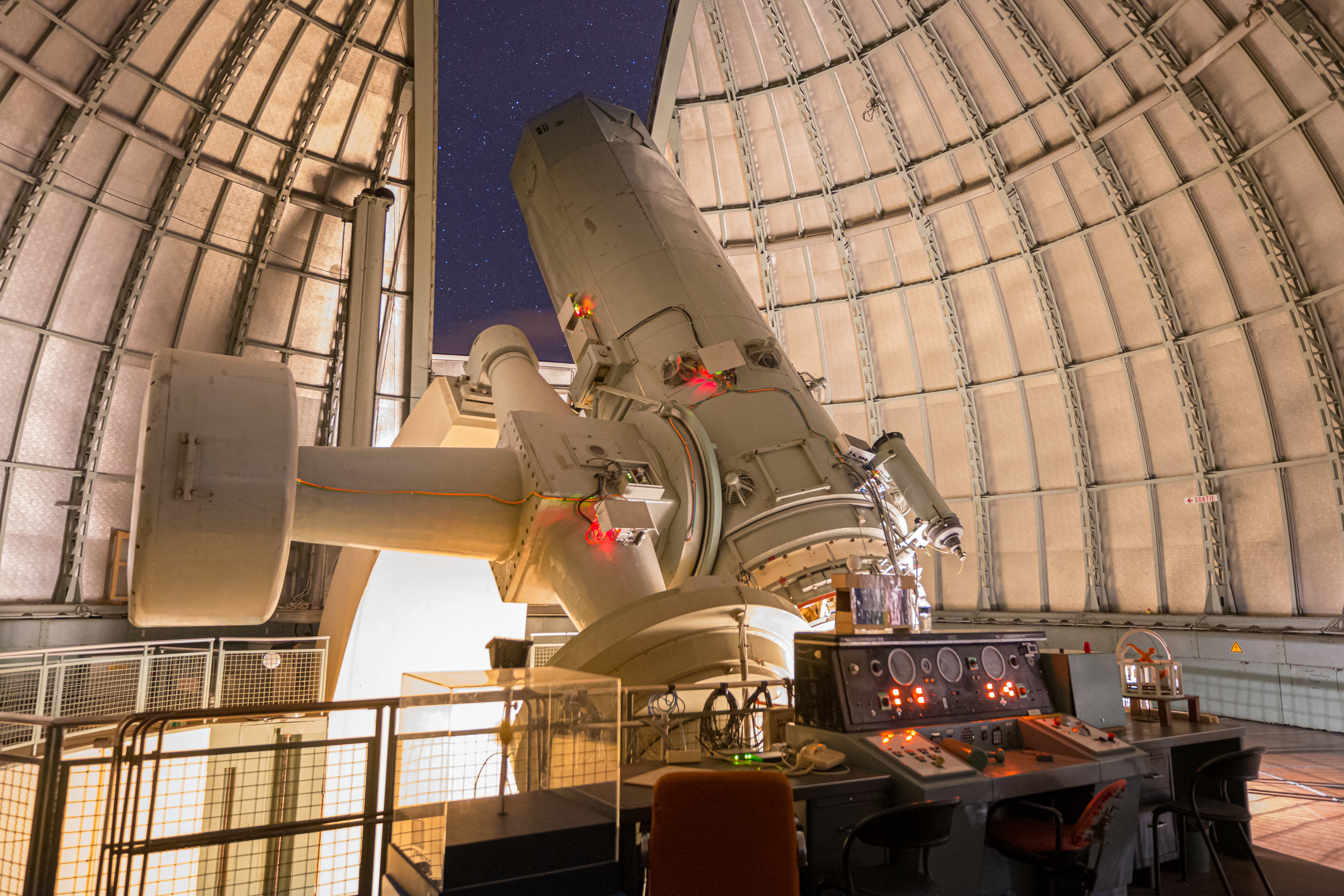
- The 1.93 meter aperture telescope, installed in 1958
- Alternative names: Observatoire de Haute-Provence
- Observatory code: 511
- Location: Saint-Michel-l'Observatoire, Alpes-de-Haute-Provence, Provence-Alpes-Côte d'Azur, Metropolitan France, France
- Coordinates: 43°55′51″N 5°42′48″E
- Altitude: 650 m (2,130 ft)
- Website: www.obs-hp.fr
- Location of Haute-Provence Observatory
- Related media on Commons

Minor planets discovered: 6
see § List of discovered minor planets

The Haute-Provence Observatory (OHP, French: Observatoire de Haute-Provence) is an astronomical observatory in the southeast of France, about 90 km east of Avignon and 100 km north of Marseille. It was established in 1937 as a national facility for French astronomers. Astronomical observations began in 1943 using the 1.20 m telescope, and the first research papers based on observations made at the observatory were published in 1944. Foreign observers first used the observatory in 1949, when Geoffrey and Margaret Burbidge visited.

The observatory lies at an altitude of about 650 m, on a plateau near the village of Saint-Michel-l'Observatoire in the Alpes-de-Haute-Provence département.

The site was chosen for an observatory because of its generally very favourable observing conditions. On average, 60% of nights are suitable for astronomical observations, with the best seasons being summer and autumn. About 170 nights per year on average are completely cloudless. The seeing is usually around 2" but can reach 1" or lower on occasion. Seeing degrades severely, sometimes to over 10", when the cold Mistral wind blows from the northwest. This happens on about 45 days per year on average, mostly during winter. Good weather conditions often follow a Mistral. On average, atmospheric absorption at OHP is roughly twice that seen at the European Southern Observatory (ESO) at La Silla, Chile.

The main-belt asteroid 7755 Haute-Provence, discovered by Belgian astronomer Eric Elst in 1989, was named for the region where the discovering observatory is located.

== Telescopes ==
The four main telescopes at OHP are reflecting telescopes with primary mirrors of diameters 1.93 m, 1.52 m, 1.20 m and 0.80 m.

The 1.93 m telescope was built by Grubb Parsons and installed at the site in 1958. One of the instruments available on the 1.93 m telescope was the high resolution ELODIE spectrograph, replaced in 2006 by the SOPHIE échelle spectrograph. Michel Mayor and Didier Queloz discovered the planet orbiting the star 51 Pegasi from observations made using ELODIE on the 1.93 m telescope. They won half of the Nobel Prize in Physics 2019 for this discovery.

The 1.52 m is almost identical to the 1.52 m telescope at the European Southern Observatory in Chile, and has been in use at OHP since 1967. It is predominantly used for spectroscopic studies, using the high resolution spectrograph Aurélie.

The 1.20 m telescope was the first to be installed at the site, and has been in use since 1943. It was originally installed at the Observatoire de Paris in 1872. It is now equipped with a direct charge-coupled device (CCD) camera at the f/6 Newton focus and is mainly used for studies of variability of X-ray sources, imaging of galaxies and H II regions and astrometry of faint solar system objects.

The 0.80 m telescope was first used during site testing at nearby Forcalquier in 1932 before the construction of the observatory, where it was later moved in 1945. The telescope is equipped with CCD cameras allowing high quality observations to be made using it, but unlike the other telescopes on site which have computer-controlled pointing systems, the 0.80 m telescope must still be pointed manually, using setting circles. It is often used by visiting undergraduate astronomy students.

Other telescopes at OHP are operated by other organizations, including a 1 m telescope belonging to Geneva Observatory, a 0.5 m telescope operated by the French Space Agency for satellite tracking, and the Berlin Exoplanet Search Telescope, a 0.2 m telescope used to search for exoplanets by observing transits across solar-type stars.

== Geophysics ==
While primarily an astronomical research facility, the observatory also hosts two geophysics research stations, one studying the mesosphere and thermosphere, and one using lasers to probe the troposphere and stratosphere, studying aerosol and ozone content, using lidar techniques.

== List of discovered minor planets ==
The Minor Planet Center credits the discovery of following minor planets directly to the observatory:

| 2630 Hermod | 14 October 1980 | list^{[A]} |
| (5499) 1981 SU2 | 29 September 1981 | list^{[B]} |
| (88286) 2001 MM_{24} | 30 June 2001 | list^{[B]} |
| (118977) 2000 WQ_{183} | 21 November 2000 | list^{[B]} |
| (322655) 1999 LC_{30} | 7 June 1999 | list^{[B]} |
| (471926) 2013 KN_{6} | 28 May 2013 | list^{[B]} |
Discovery credited by the MPC to:^{A} "Institute d'Astrophysics"^{B} "Haute Provence"

== See also ==
- List of asteroid-discovering observatories
- List of astronomical observatories
- List of minor planet discoverers § Discovering dedicated institutions
- List of observatory codes
- Lists of telescopes
