= HD 75289 b =

Extrasolar planet in the constellation Vela

Discovery
- Discovered by: Udry et al.
- Discovery date: February 1, 1999
- Detection method: Radial velocity

Orbital characteristics
- Semi-major axis: 0.0482 ± 0.0028 AU
- Eccentricity: 0.034 ± 0.029
- Orbital period (sidereal): 3.509267 ± 0.000064 d
- Longitude of perihelion: 141°
- Time of perihelion: 2,450,830.34 ± 0.48 JD
- Semi-amplitude: 54.9 ± 1.8 m/s

Physical characteristics
- Mass: >0.467 ± 0.041 M_{J}

HD 75289 b is an extrasolar planet orbiting the star HD 75289 in the constellation Vela. It has a minimum mass half that of Jupiter, and it orbits in a very short orbit completing one circular revolution around the star in three and a half days. By studying the starlight scientists have concluded that the planet must have an albedo less than 0.12, rather low for a gas giant. Otherwise its reflected light would have been detected.

This planet was discovered by the Geneva Extrasolar Planet Search team using Doppler spectroscopy.

== See also ==
- List of exoplanets discovered before 2000
