= HD 75289 =

Double star in the constellation Vela

- Location of HD 75289 (circled in red)

Observation data Epoch J2000.0 Equinox ICRS
- Constellation: Vela
- A
- Right ascension: 08^{h} 47^{m} 40.38937^{s}
- Declination: −41° 44′ 12.4553″
- Apparent magnitude (V): 6.35
- B
- Right ascension: 08^{h} 47^{m} 42.26163^{s}
- Declination: −41° 44′ 07.4408″
- Apparent magnitude (V): 11.80

Characteristics
- Evolutionary stage: main sequence
- Spectral type: G0V + M2-M5V
- B−V color index: 0.578

Astrometry

A
Radial velocity (R_{v})	+9.31±0.13 km/s
Proper motion (μ)	RA: −20.376 mas/yr Dec.: −227.987 mas/yr
Parallax (π)	34.4545±0.0165 mas
Distance	94.66 ± 0.05 ly (29.02 ± 0.01 pc)
Absolute magnitude (M_{V})	4.04

B
Proper motion (μ)	RA: −13.817 mas/yr Dec.: −229.657 mas/yr
Parallax (π)	34.1784±0.1208 mas
Distance	95.4 ± 0.3 ly (29.3 ± 0.1 pc)

Details

A
Mass	1.141+0.020 −0.035 M_{☉}
Radius	1.298±0.013 R_{☉}
Luminosity	1.99 L_{☉}
Surface gravity (log g)	4.317±0.680 cgs
Temperature	6,184±43 K
Metallicity [Fe/H]	0.32±0.08 dex
Rotation	~15.95 d
Rotational velocity (v sin i)	2.978±0.722 km/s
Age	4.410+0.757 −0.337 Gyr

B
Mass	0.135±0.003 M_{☉}

Other designations
- CD−41°4507, HD 75289, HIP 43177, HR 3497, SAO 220481, WDS J08477-4144, 2MASS J08474038-4144119

Database references
SIMBAD	A
- B
Exoplanet Archive	data

HD 75289 is a faint double star in the southern constellation of Vela. The primary component has a yellow hue and an apparent visual magnitude of 6.35. Under exceptionally good circumstances it might be visible to the unaided eye; however, usually binoculars are needed. The pair are located at a distance of 95 light-years from the Sun based on parallax, and are drifting further away with a radial velocity of +9.3 km/s.

The brighter member, component A, is a G-type main-sequence star like the Sun with a stellar classification of G0V. In 1982 it was classified as a supergiant, but this proved erroneous. It has an age comparable to the Sun and is considered metal-rich, with a greater abundance of heavier elements compared to the Sun. The star has 14% more mass than the Sun and a 30% greater girth. It is spinning with a projected rotational velocity of 3 km/s, giving it a ~16 day rotation period. The star is radiating double the luminosity of the Sun from its photosphere at an effective temperature of 6,184 K.

In 2004, a co-moving stellar companion was identified, based on an earlier suggestion from 2001. Designated component B, this red dwarf star lies at an angular separation of 21.5″, corresponding to a projected separation of 621 AU. However, the radial distance between the stars is unknown, so they are probably further apart. In any case, one revolution around the primary would take thousands of years to complete. The study that found the red dwarf also ruled out any further stellar companions beyond 140 AU and massive brown dwarf companions from 400 AU up to 2,000 AU.

== Planetary system ==
In 1999, an exoplanet with half the mass of Jupiter, HD 75289 b, was detected orbiting the primary star by the radial velocity method. This exoplanet is a typical hot Jupiter that takes only about 3.51 days to revolve at an orbital distance of 0.0482 AU.

The HD 75289 planetary system
Companion (in order from star)	Mass	Semimajor axis (AU)	Orbital period (days)	Eccentricity	Inclination (°)	Radius
b	≥0.456±0.010 M_{J}	0.047859±0.000002	3.50916±0.00002	0.062±0.022	—	—

== See also ==
- List of exoplanets discovered before 2000 - HD 75289 b
