= HD 171028 =

Star in the constellation Ophiuchus

Observation data Epoch J2000.0 Equinox ICRS
- Constellation: Ophiuchus
- Right ascension: 18^{h} 32^{m} 15.4934^{s}
- Declination: +06° 56′ 44.686″
- Apparent magnitude (V): 8.301

Characteristics
- Evolutionary stage: subgiant
- Spectral type: G0
- B−V color index: 0.61

Astrometry
Radial velocity (R_{v})	+13.48±0.28 km/s
Proper motion (μ)	RA: −42.958±0.020 mas/yr Dec.: −14.715±0.020 mas/yr
Parallax (π)	8.9085±0.0211 mas
Distance	366.1 ± 0.9 ly (112.3 ± 0.3 pc)

Details
Mass	1.01±0.06 M_{☉}
Radius	2.42+0.01 −0.03 R_{☉}
Luminosity	5.406+0.042 −0.041 L_{☉}
Surface gravity (log g)	3.84±0.03 cgs
Temperature	5,671±16 K
Metallicity [Fe/H]	−0.48±0.01 dex
Rotational velocity (v sin i)	2.3 km/s
Age	4.890±0.229 Gyr

Other designations
- BD+06 3833, TYC 458-1450-1, 2MASS J18321548+0656446

Database references
SIMBAD	data

HD 171028 is a star with an exoplanet companion in the equatorial constellation of Ophiuchus. With an apparent visual magnitude of 8.3, it is too faint to be readily visible with the naked eye. Unlike most planet-harboring stars, it does not have a Hipparcos number. The star is located at a distance of approximately 365 light years from the Sun based on parallax, and is drifting further away with a radial velocity of +13.5 km/s.

This is a yellow-hued G-type star of unknown luminosity class with a stellar classification of G0. It is a metal-poor star belonging to the thin disk population. HD 171028 is estimated to be nearly five billion years old and is spinning with a projected rotational velocity of 2.3 km/s. It has the same mass as the Sun, but the radius is 2.4 times larger. The star is radiating 5.4 times the luminosity of the Sun from its photosphere at an effective temperature of 5,671 K.

In the summer of 2007, a Jovian planetary companion was discovered by the HARPS planet search program using the radial velocity method. This object is orbiting at a distance of 1.32 AU from the host star with a period of 1.5 years and an eccentricity (ovalness) of 0.59. Since the inclination of the orbit is unknown, only a minimum mass can be determined. This planet has at least double the mass of Jupiter.

The HD 171028 planetary system
Companion (in order from star)	Mass	Semimajor axis (AU)	Orbital period (days)	Eccentricity	Inclination (°)	Radius
b	≥1.98 M_{J}	1.32	550±3	0.59±0.01	—	—

== See also ==
- List of extrasolar planets
