= 51 Pegasi =

Star in the constellation Pegasus

51 Pegasi/Helvetios
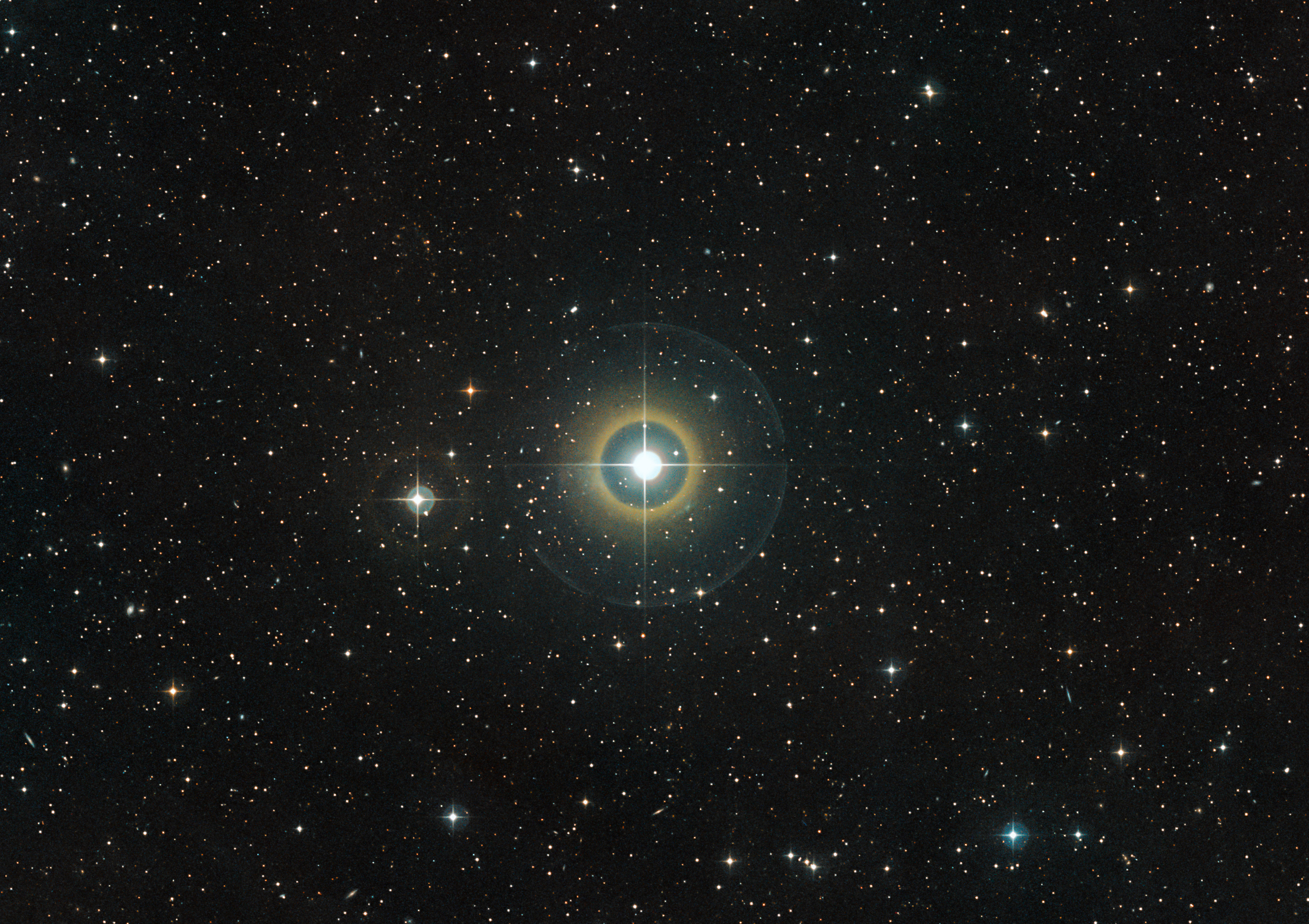
- 51 Pegasi imaged by European Southern Observatory

Observation data Epoch J2000.0 Equinox ICRS
- Constellation: Pegasus
- Right ascension: 22^{h} 57^{m} 27.9805^{s}
- Declination: +20° 46′ 07.797″
- Apparent magnitude (V): 5.49

Characteristics
- Evolutionary stage: main sequence
- Spectral type: G2V+
- Apparent magnitude (B): 6.16
- Apparent magnitude (R): 5.0
- Apparent magnitude (I): 4.7
- Apparent magnitude (J): 4.66
- Apparent magnitude (H): 4.23
- Apparent magnitude (K): 3.91
- U−B color index: +0.20
- B−V color index: +0.67

Astrometry
Radial velocity (R_{v})	−33.33 km/s
Proper motion (μ)	RA: +207.328 mas/yr Dec.: +61.164 mas/yr
Parallax (π)	64.4048±0.0543 mas
Distance	50.64 ± 0.04 ly (15.53 ± 0.01 pc)
Absolute magnitude (M_{V})	4.48

Details
Mass	1.09±0.02 M_{☉}
Radius	1.152±0.009 R_{☉}
Luminosity	1.398±0.016 L_{☉}
Surface gravity (log g)	4.33±0.02 cgs
Temperature	5,768±8 K
Metallicity [Fe/H]	+0.18±0.01 dex
Rotation	21.9±0.4 days
Rotational velocity (v sin i)	2.54±0.62 km/s
Age	4.8+0.7 −0.4 Gyr

Other designations
- Helvetios, BD+19°5036, GJ 882, HD 217014, HIP 113357, HR 8729, SAO 90896

Database references
SIMBAD	data
Exoplanet Archive	data
ARICNS	data

51 Pegasi, also named Helvetios (/hɛlˈviːʃiəs/), is a Sun-like star located 50.6 light-years (15.5 parsecs) from Earth in the constellation of Pegasus. It was the first main-sequence star found to have an exoplanet (designated 51 Pegasi b, officially named Dimidium) orbiting it.

== Properties ==
Zooming into 51 Pegasi

51 Pegasi (circled) in the constellation Pegasus

The star's apparent magnitude is 5.49, making it visible with the naked eye under suitable viewing conditions.

51 Pegasi was listed as a standard star for the spectral type G2IV in the 1989 The Perkins catalog of revised MK types for the cooler stars. Historically, it was generally given a stellar classification of G5V, and even in more modern catalogues it is usually listed as a main-sequence star. The NStars project assign it a G2V spectral class. It is generally considered to still be generating energy through the thermonuclear fusion of hydrogen at its core, but to be in a more evolved state than the Sun. The effective temperature of the chromosphere is about 5,571 K (5,298 °C; 9,568 °F), giving 51 Pegasi the characteristic yellow hue of a G-type star. It is estimated to be around 4.8 billion years old, slightly older than the Sun, with a radius 11.5% larger and 9% more mass. The star has a higher proportion of elements other than hydrogen/helium compared to the Sun; a quantity astronomers term a star's metallicity. Stars with higher metallicity such as this are more likely to host giant planets. In 1996, astronomers Baliunas, Sokoloff, and Soon measured a rotational period of 37 days for 51 Pegasi.

Although the star was suspected of being variable during a 1981 study, subsequent observation showed there was almost no chromospheric activity between 1977 and 1989. Further examination between 1994 and 2007 showed a similar low or flat level of activity. This, along with its relatively low X-ray emission, suggests that the star may be in a Maunder minimum period during which a star produces a reduced number of star spots.

The star rotates at an inclination of 53^{+25}_{−11} degrees relative to Earth.

== Nomenclature ==
51 Pegasi is the Flamsteed designation. On its discovery, the star's planet — and actually the first exoplanet discovered around a main-sequence star — was designated 51 Pegasi b by its discoverers and unofficially dubbed Bellerophon, in keeping with the convention of naming planets after Greek and Roman mythological figures (Bellerophon was a figure from Greek mythology who rode the winged horse Pegasus).

In July 2014, the International Astronomical Union launched NameExoWorlds, a process for giving proper names to certain exoplanets and their host stars. The process involved public nomination and voting for the new names. In December 2015, the IAU announced the names of Helvetios for this star and Dimidium for its planet.

The names were those submitted by the Astronomische Gesellschaft Luzern, Switzerland. "Helvetios" is Latin for "the Helvetian" and refers to the Celtic tribe that lived in Switzerland during antiquity; 'Dimidium' is Latin for 'half', referring to the planet's mass of at least half the mass of Jupiter.

In 2016, the IAU organized a Working Group on Star Names (WGSN) to catalog and standardize proper names for stars. In its first bulletin of July 2016, the WGSN explicitly recognized the names of exoplanets and their host stars approved by the Executive Committee Working Group Public Naming of Planets and Planetary Satellites, including the names of stars adopted during the 2015 NameExoWorlds campaign. This star is now so entered in the IAU Catalog of Star Names.

== Planetary system ==
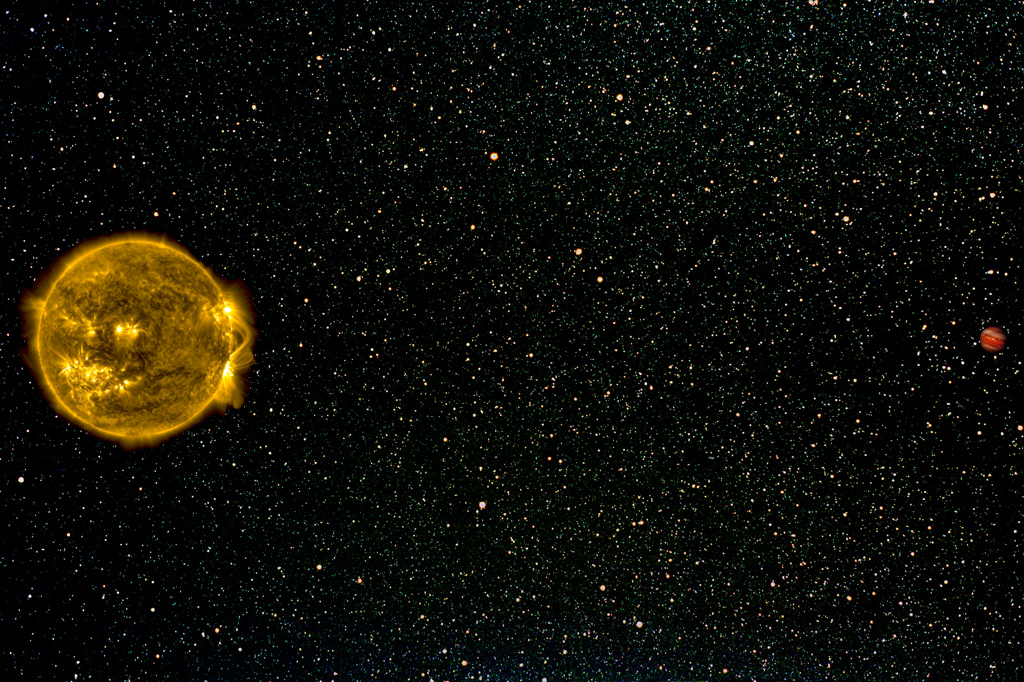
Artist's impression of the 51 Pegasi planetary system (shown to scale)

On October 6, 1995, Swiss astronomers Michel Mayor and Didier Queloz announced the discovery of an exoplanet orbiting 51 Pegasi. The discovery was made at Observatoire de Haute-Provence in France. On 8 October 2019, Mayor and Queloz shared the Nobel Prize in Physics for their discovery.

51 Pegasi b (51 Peg b) was the first discovered exoplanet around a main-sequence star. It orbits very close to the star, experiences estimated temperatures around 1,200 °C (1,500 K; 2,200 °F) and has a mass at least half that of Jupiter. At the time of its discovery, this close distance was not compatible with theories of planet formation and resulted in discussions of planetary migration. However, several hot Jupiters are now known to be oblique relative to the stellar axis.

A 2026 study analysing radial velocity data found tentative evidence for a second orbiting body in the system. Combined with non-detections in direct imaging and astrometric acceleration, they find that the companion would be either a super-Jupiter orbiting between 15 and 100 au or a brown dwarf orbiting between 20 and 170 au. However, they note that the signal is likely an instrumental artifact rather than being caused by a companion.

The 51 Pegasi planetary system
Companion (in order from star)	Mass	Semimajor axis (AU)	Orbital period (days)	Eccentricity	Inclination (°)	Radius
b (Dimidium)	0.61+0.06 −0.05 M_{J}	0.052344942(2)	4.2307966(27)	<0.0063	49.8+5.8 −5.7	1.07±0.14 R_{J}

== See also ==
Star systems

- 47 Ursae Majoris
- 55 Cancri
- 70 Virginis
- PSR B1257+12
- Tau Boötis
- Upsilon Andromedae

Other articles

- Lists of exoplanets
- Solar analog
