= ELODIE spectrograph =

ELODIE was an echelle spectrograph installed on the 1.93m reflector at the Observatoire de Haute-Provence in south-eastern France. Its optical instrumentation was developed by André Baranne from the Marseille Observatory. The purpose of the instrument was extrasolar planet detection by the radial velocity method.

ELODIE's first light was achieved in 1993. The instrument was decommissioned in August 2006 and replaced in September 2006 by SOPHIE, a new instrument of the same type but with improved features.

== Characteristics ==
The instrument could observe the electromagnetic spectrum over a wavelength range of 389.5 nm to 681.5 nm in a single exposure, split into 67 spectral orders. The instrument, which was located in a temperature-controlled room, was fed with optical fibers from the Cassegrain focus. The observatory provided an integrated data reduction pipeline which fully reduced the spectra immediately after acquisition and allowed the user to measure radial velocities to an accuracy as good as ±7 m/s.

Over 34,000 spectra were taken with ELODIE, over 20,000 of which are publicly available through a dedicated on-line archive. The instrument was the result of a collaboration between the observatories of Haute-Provence, Geneva and Marseille. A publication describing the instrument appeared in Astronomy & Astrophysics Supplements.

== Discovered planets ==
The first extrasolar planet to be discovered orbiting a Sun-like star, 51 Pegasi b, was discovered in 1995 using ELODIE. Michel Mayor and Didier Queloz received the Nobel Prize in Physics in 2019 for their achievement. Over twenty such planets have been found with ELODIE.

The instrument was also used to find a planet by the transit method.

Planet	Announced in	Ref
51 Pegasi b	1995	
Gliese 876 b	1998	
14 Herculis b	1998	
HD 209458 b	1999	

== See also ==
- CORALIE spectrograph is a similar instrument at La Silla Observatory in Chile
- List of extrasolar planets
