= Didier Queloz =

Swiss astronomer (born 1966)

Didier Queloz FRS
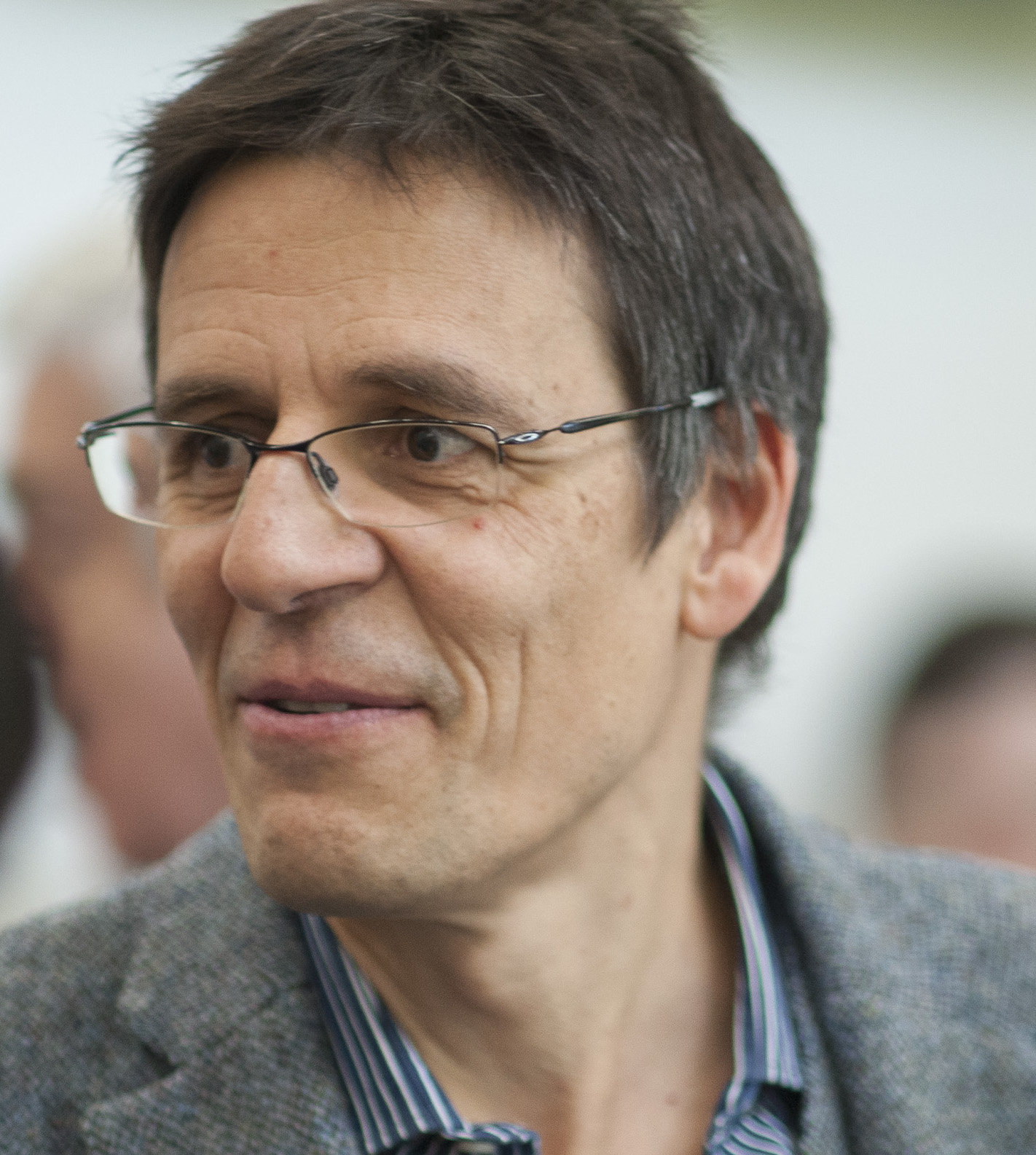
- Queloz in 2017
- Born: 23 February 1966 (age 60); Switzerland
- Education: University of Geneva (MS, DEA, PhD)
- Known for: First person to find a planet orbiting a Sun-like star outside of the Solar System
- Awards: Wolf Prize in Physics (2017); Nobel Prize in Physics (2019); National Order of the Legion of Honour (2022)
- Scientific career
- Fields: Astronomy
- Workplaces: ETH Zurich; University of Cambridge
- Thesis: Recherches liées à la spectroscopie par corrélation croisée numérique; (INTER-TACOS: guide de l'utilisateur) (1995)
- Doctoral advisor: Michel Mayor

Didier Patrick Queloz FRS (French pronunciation: [didje kəlo, kelo]; born 23 February 1966) is a Swiss astronomer. He is the Jacksonian Professor of Natural Philosophy at the University of Cambridge, where he is also a fellow of Trinity College, Cambridge, as well as a professor of physics at ETH Zurich. Together with Michel Mayor in 1995, he discovered 51 Pegasi b, the first extrasolar planet orbiting a Sun-like star, 51 Pegasi. For this discovery, he shared the 2019 Nobel Prize in Physics with Mayor and Jim Peebles. In 2022, he is the founding director of the Center for the Origin and Prevalence of Life at ETH Zurich.

== Early life and education ==
Queloz was born in Switzerland, on 23 February 1966.

Queloz studied at the University of Geneva where he subsequently obtained a MSc degree in physics in 1990, a DEA in Astronomy and Astrophysics in 1992, and a PhD degree in 1995 with Swiss astrophysicist Michel Mayor as his doctoral advisor.

The Daily Telegraph reports him as saying that, "Science inherited a lot from religion".

== Career and research ==
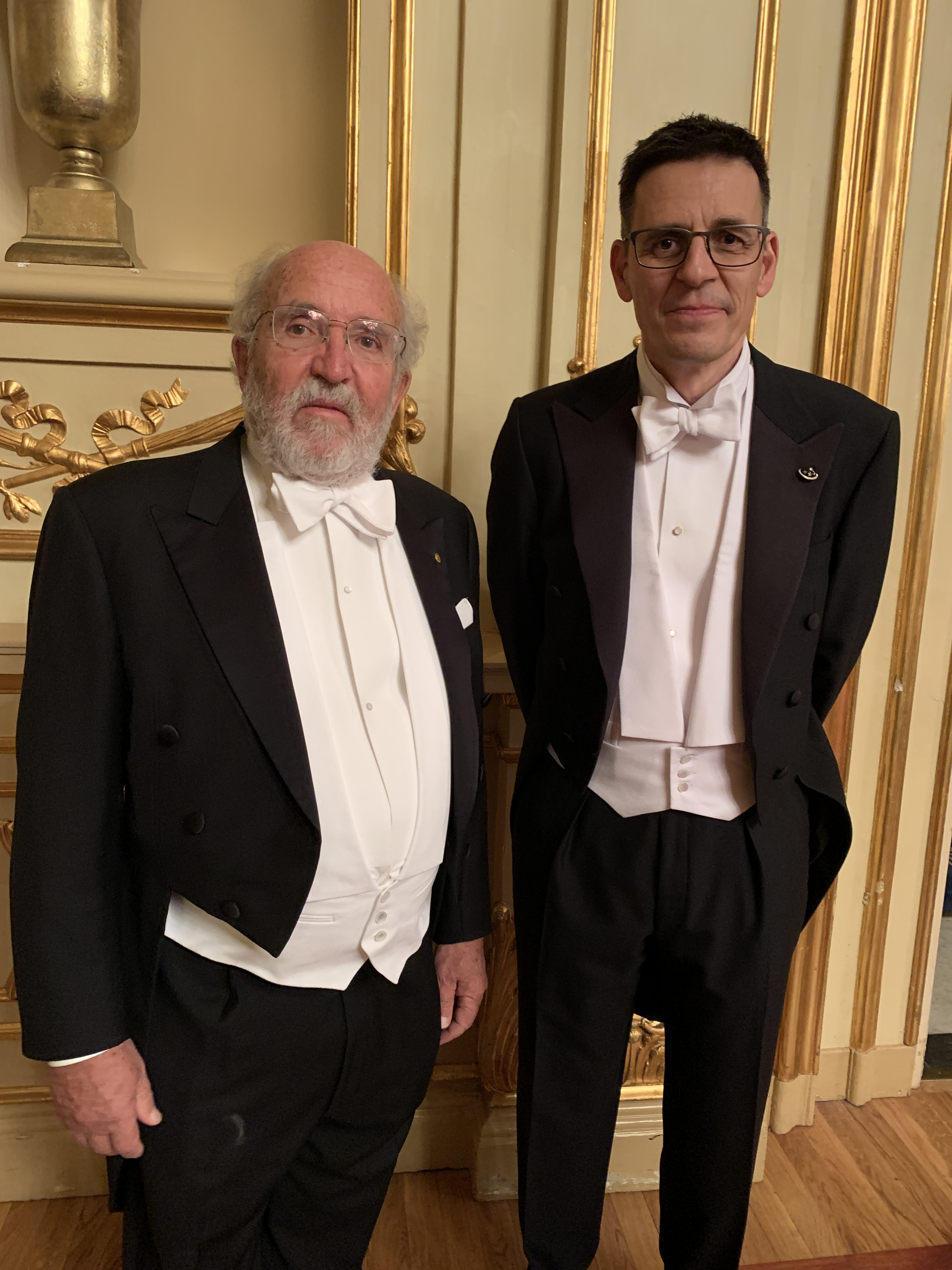
Michel Mayor and Didier Queloz (2019) during Nobel week ceremony award

=== Early research and discovery of 51 Pegasi b (1990–1995) ===
Didier Queloz is at the origin of the "exoplanet revolution" in astrophysics when as part of his PhD at the University of Geneva, with his supervisor, they discovered the first exoplanet around a main sequence star. In 1995 with Michel Mayor announced a giant planet orbiting the star 51 Pegasi; the planet was identified as 51 Pegasi b and determined to be of a Hot Jupiter. The planet was detected by the measurement of small periodic changes in stellar radial velocity produced by the orbiting planet. Detecting this small variability by the Doppler effect had been possible thanks to the development of a new type of spectrograph, ELODIE, installed at the Haute-Provence Observatory, combined creative approach to measuring precise stellar radial velocity. For this achievement, they were awarded half of the 2019 Nobel Prize in Physics "for the discovery of an exoplanet orbiting a solar-type star" resulting in "contributions to our understanding of the evolution of the universe and Earth's place in the cosmos."

This seminal discovery has spawned a revolution in astronomy and kickstarted the research field of exoplanets. Over the next 25 years, Didier Queloz's main scientific contributions have essentially been focused to expand our detection and measurement capabilities of these systems to retrieve information on their physical structure. The goal is to better understand their formation and evolution by comparison with the Solar System. In the course of his career, he developed new astronomical equipment, novel observational approaches, and detection algorithms. He participated and conducted programs leading to the detection of hundred planets, including breakthrough results.

=== Development of radial velocity techniques and instrumentation (mid-1990s–early 2000s) ===
Early in his career, he identified stellar activity as a potential limitation for planet detection. He published a reference paper describing how to disentangle stellar activity from a planetary signal using proxies, including new algorithms that have become standard practice in all planet publications based on precise Doppler spectroscopy data. With this work he set the foundation to optimize measurements of stellar radial velocity that is still in use today.

Queloz received the 2011 BBVA Foundation Frontiers of Knowledge Award of Basic Sciences (co-winner with Mayor) for developing new astronomical instruments and experimental techniques that led to the first observation of planets outside the Solar System.

=== Transiting planets and spin–orbit architecture (2000–2010) ===
Shortly after the start of the ELODIE planet survey at OHP, he led the installation of an improved version (CORALIE), on the Swiss 1.2-metre Leonhard Euler Telescope. Very quickly this new facility started to detect exoplanets on stars visible in the southern hemisphere. In 2000, he took the responsibility, as a project scientist, in the development of HARPS, a new type of spectrograph for the ESO 3.6m telescope. This instrument commissioned in 2003 was about to become a reference in the business of precise Doppler spectroscopy. HARPS performances, allied with the development of a new analysis software inherited from all past experiences gathered with ELODIE and CORALIE, would considerably improve the precision of the Doppler technique. Eventually, it would deliver spectacular detections of smaller exoplanets in the realm of Neptune, super-Earth systems before Kepler would massively detect them and establish their statistic occurrence.

=== Planetary structure, densities, and statistical methods (2003–2010) ===
After the announcement of the detection of the first transiting planet (in 1999), Didier Queloz's research interest got broader with the objective to combine capabilities offered by transiting planets and follow-up Doppler spectroscopy measurements. In 2000 he achieved the first spectroscopic transit detection of an exoplanet using the so-called Rossiter-McLaughlin effect. This type of measurement essentially tells us about the projected angle between the stellar angular momentum vector and the planet orbital angular momentum vector. The pinnacle of this program would be reached 10 years later, after he led a significant upgrade of CORALIE, and established a collaboration with the Wide Angle Search for Planets (WASP) consortium in the UK. With his Ph.D. student they demonstrated a significant number of the planets were surprisingly misaligned or in a retrograde orbit, providing a new insight about their formation process. In 2017 he received the Wolf Prize in Physics 2017 for that work and all the planet discoveries he had made.

The special geometry of transiting planets combined with precise Doppler spectroscopic observations allow us to measure the mass and radius of planets and to compute their bulk densities to get insights about their physical structure. In 2003 Didier Queloz, recently appointed at a faculty position, with his research team pioneered and established the combination of these techniques by first measuring bulk density of OGLE transiting planets. They also looked for transit opportunities on known radial velocity planets and they found the first transiting Neptune-size planet Gliese 436 b. In the course of this program and a collaboration with his Colleague S. Zucker from Tel-Aviv University, they developed the mathematical foundation to compute residual noise they encountered during the analysis of transit they were trying to model. They established statistical metric to address pink noise in the data. Today this concept is widely used in the field to estimate systematics in light-curves and transit modelling.

In 2007 Didier Queloz became associate professor. Over the next 5 years following his nomination his research program based on the combination of spectroscopy and transit detection intensified. He took the lead in the spectroscopic follow-up effort of the WASP consortium and the CoRoT space mission. The combination of WASP and Corot data with follow-up observations using EulerCam (CCD imager ), CORALIE spectrograph, HARPS spectrograph, and other main ESO facilities was amazingly successful. It led to more than 100 publications, some of them breakthroughs providing new insights on the formation and nature of hot Jupiter-type planets. Further, in the same period, the detection of COROT-7b combined with an intensive follow-up campaign established the first planet detection with a bulk density similar to a rocky planet.

All follow-up expertise he developed naturally extended to the Kepler space telescope era with HARPS-N consortium confirming the Earth-like bulk density of Kepler-10. On the ground-based transit programs, Didier Queloz was deeply involved in the design and installation of a new generation of survey telescope: the NGTS Observatory. His role was decisive during system tests in Europe and to establish the facility at the Paranal Observatory in the Atacama Desert in northern Chile.

=== Cambridge period and institutional leadership (2013–present) ===
At the time Didier Queloz moved to the University of Cambridge, he essentially focused his activity to set up a comprehensive research activity directed to the detection of Earth-like planets and life in the Universe, and to further develop the exoplanet community in UK. When he left Switzerland, he was co-directing a major national initiative which eventually got funded. At Cambridge with the help of his colleagues of the IoA and DAMTP he established the Cambridge Exoplanet Research Centre to stimulate joint coordinated efforts and collaborations between departments. In UK he organized the first "Exoplanet community meeting" and installed the idea of a regular yearly "community" workshop. In the European context, he is leading at Geneva (through his joint Professor appointment) the development of the ground segment CHEOPS space mission and he chairs the science team.

=== Earth-like exoplanets, habitability, and origins-of-life research (2015–present) ===
His most recent research highlights are related to the search for transiting Earth-like planets on low mass stars and Universal life. This program, carried out in collaboration with M. Gillon from the University of Liège, is at the origins of the detection of TRAPPIST-1, a planetary system potentially interesting to further search for atmosphere and life signature. Another successful avenue of research is the characterization of the rocky surface or atmosphere of hot small planets with the work on 55 Cancri e. The recent extension of this program towards "Life in the Universe" is carried out in the context of an international research initiative supported by the Simons Foundation. The highlight result of this collaboration is the definition – combining chemistry and astrophysical constraints – of minimum conditions for the origins of RNA precursors on exoplanets ("abiogenesis zone").

=== The post-2019 period ===
Since 2019, Queloz has increasingly focused his research on the detection and characterisation of Earth-like exoplanets and on questions related to habitability and the origins of life. He is a principal investigator or co-leader of several long-term observational programmes designed to identify terrestrial planets around nearby stars using complementary ground- and space-based techniques. He plays a central role in the CHEOPS (Characterising Exoplanet Satellite) mission, an ESA space telescope dedicated to the precise measurement of exoplanet radii through transit observations. CHEOPS combines space-based photometry with ground-based radial-velocity measurements to determine planetary densities and internal structures, and has contributed to detailed characterisation of a wide range of exoplanet systems.

Queloz is also involved in the SPECULOOS project, a ground-based survey targeting nearby ultra-cool dwarf stars in order to search for transiting Earth-sized planets, building on the discovery of the TRAPPIST-1 planetary system. In parallel, he leads or contributes to ultra-high-precision radial-velocity efforts aimed at detecting true Earth analogues, including the Terra Hunting Experiment, which uses the HARPS-3 spectrograph to carry out long-duration monitoring of Sun-like stars.

In 2021, Queloz moved to ETH Zurich as a Professor of physics and became Director of the Centre for the Origin and Prevalence of Life, an interdisciplinary research centre dedicated to studying the emergence of life in planetary environments. He is also Director of the Leverhulme Centre for Life in the Universe at the University of Cambridge, which brings together astrophysics, chemistry, planetary science, and biology to address questions concerning habitability and life beyond Earth.

His recent work integrates observational astronomy with chemical and physical constraints on prebiotic processes, linking exoplanet characterisation to broader questions about the conditions required for life to emerge

== Highlights and publications ==
Didier Queloz has over 400 scientific publications, attracting over 50,000 citations. His H-index is 115.

== Awards ==
- 2011: BBVA Foundation Frontiers of Knowledge Award of Basic Sciences (co-winner with Michel Mayor)
- 2013: Clarivate Citation Laureates
- 2017: Wolf Prize in Physics
- 2019: Nobel Prize in Physics
- 2020: Elected Fellow of the Royal Society
- 2020: AeroSuisse Award (shared with CHEOPS team)
- 2022: National Order of the Legion of Honour

Named after him

- Asteroid 177415 Queloz was named in his honor.

Academic offices
Vacant Title last held by James Stirling	Jacksonian Professor of Natural Philosophy; 2021 – present	Incumbent
