= 51 Pegasi b =

Exoplanet orbiting 51 Pegasi

51 Pegasi b/Dimidium
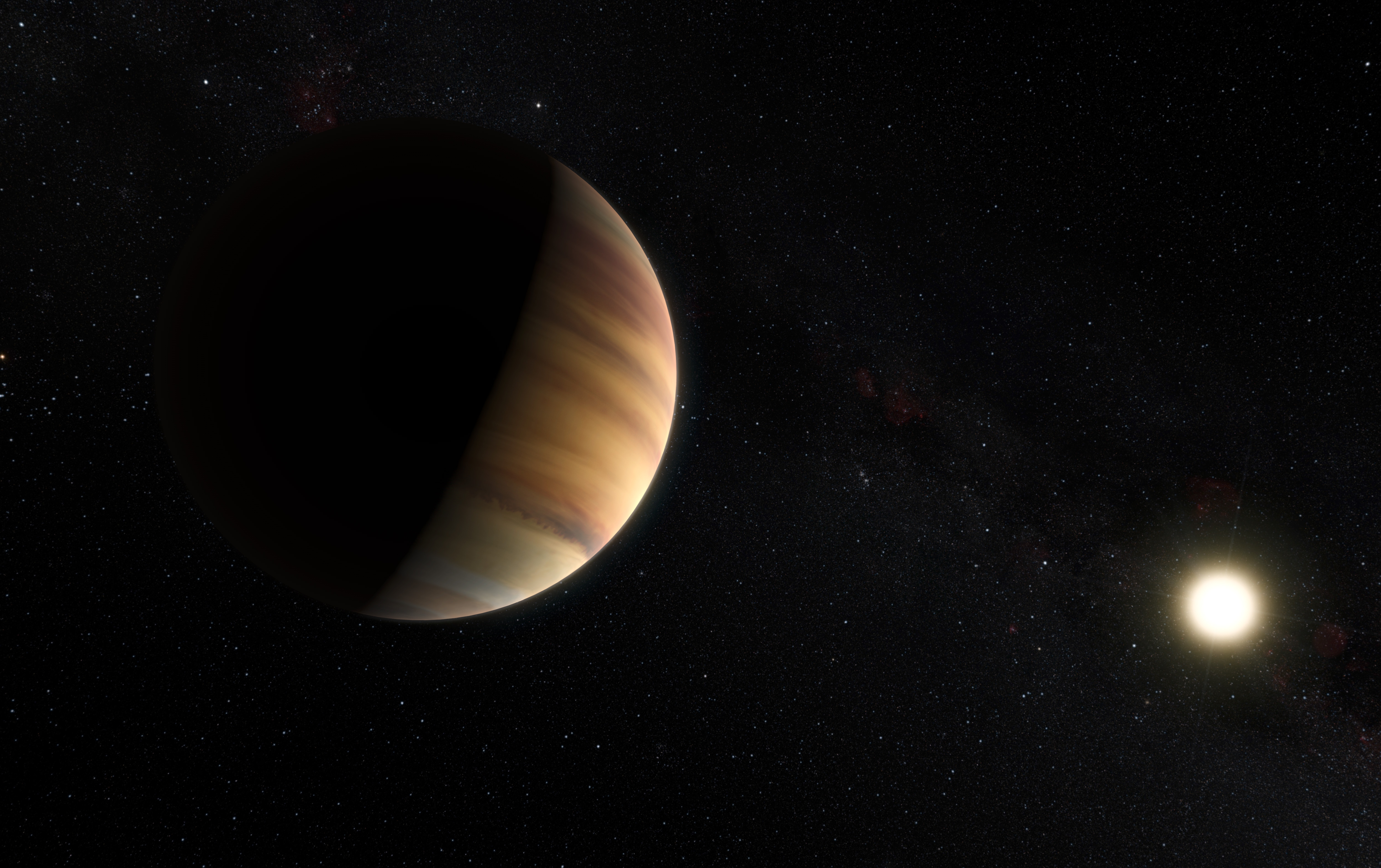
- An artist's impression of 51 Pegasi b (left) and its star (right)

Discovery
- Discovered by: Michel Mayor and Didier Queloz
- Discovery site: OHP, France
- Discovery date: 6 October 1995; 31 years ago
- Detection method: Radial velocity (ELODIE)

Designations
- Alternative names: Dimidium

Orbital characteristics
- Semi-major axis: 0.052344942(2) au (7,830,691.9 km)
- Eccentricity: <0.0063
- Orbital period (sidereal): 4.2307966±0.0000027 days
- Inclination: 49.8°+5.8° −5.7°
- Semi-amplitude: 55.77±0.15 km/s
- Star: 51 Pegasi

Physical characteristics
- Mean radius: 1.07±0.14 R_{J}
- Mass: 0.61+0.06 −0.05 M_{J}
- Surface gravity: 10^{3.15±0.12} cgs
- Temperature: 1,250 K

51 Pegasi b, officially named Dimidium (/dɪˈmɪdiəm/), is an extrasolar planet approximately 50 light-years (15 parsecs) away in the constellation Pegasus. Dimidium was the first exoplanet to be discovered orbiting a main-sequence star, the Sun-like 51 Pegasi — a major astronomical discovery. It is the prototype for a class of planets called hot Jupiters.

In 2017, traces of water were discovered in the planet's atmosphere. In 2019, the Nobel Prize in Physics was awarded in part for the discovery of 51 Pegasi b.

== Name ==
51 Pegasi is the Flamsteed designation of the host star. The planet was originally designated 51 Pegasi b by Michel Mayor and Didier Queloz, who discovered the planet in 1995. The following year it was unofficially dubbed "Bellerophon" /bɛˈlɛrəfɒn/ by astronomer Geoffrey Marcy, who followed the convention of naming planets after Greek and Roman mythological figures (Bellerophon is a figure from Greek mythology who rode the winged horse Pegasus).

In July 2014, the International Astronomical Union launched NameExoWorlds, a process for giving proper names to certain exoplanets and their host stars. The process involved public nomination and voting for the new names. In December 2015, the IAU announced the winning name for this planet was Dimidium. The name was submitted by the Astronomische Gesellschaft Luzern (German for 'Astronomical Society of Lucerne'), Switzerland. 'Dimidium' is Latin for 'half', referring to the planet's mass of approximately half the mass of Jupiter.

== Discovery ==
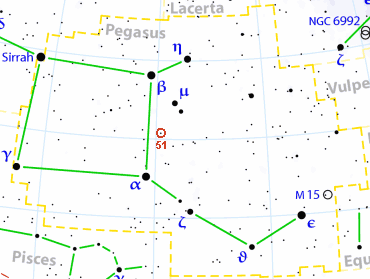
The location of 51 Pegasi in Pegasus

The exoplanet's discovery was announced on October 6, 1995, by Michel Mayor and Didier Queloz of the University of Geneva in the journal Nature. They used the radial velocity method with the ELODIE spectrograph on the Observatoire de Haute-Provence telescope in France and made world headlines with their announcement. For this discovery, they were awarded the 2019 Nobel Prize in Physics.

The planet was discovered using a sensitive spectroscope that could detect the slight and regular velocity changes in the star's spectral lines of around 70 metres per second. These changes are caused by the planet's gravitational effects from just 7 million kilometres' distance from the star.

Within a week of the announcement, the planet was confirmed by another team using the Lick Observatory in California.

== Physical characteristics ==
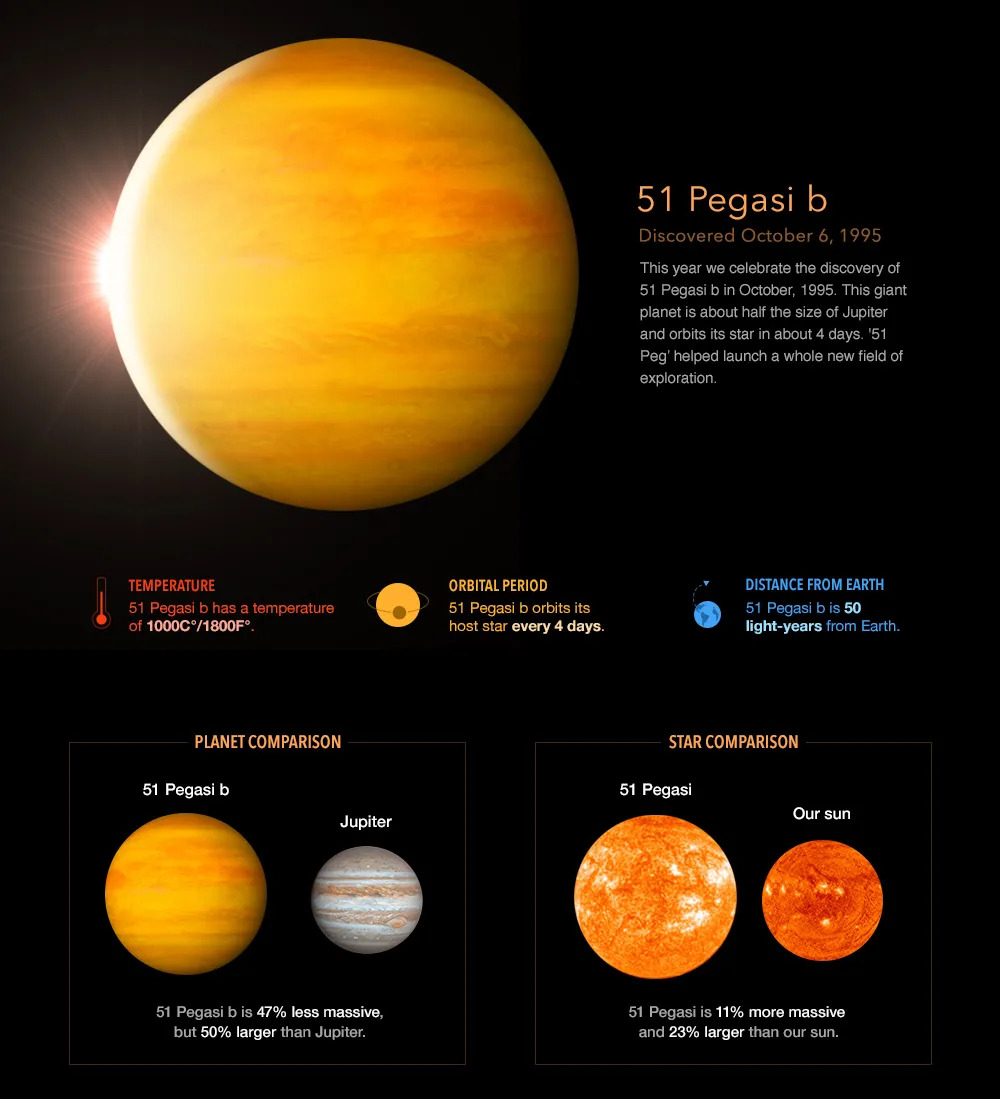
Profile of planet 51 Pegasi b by NASA

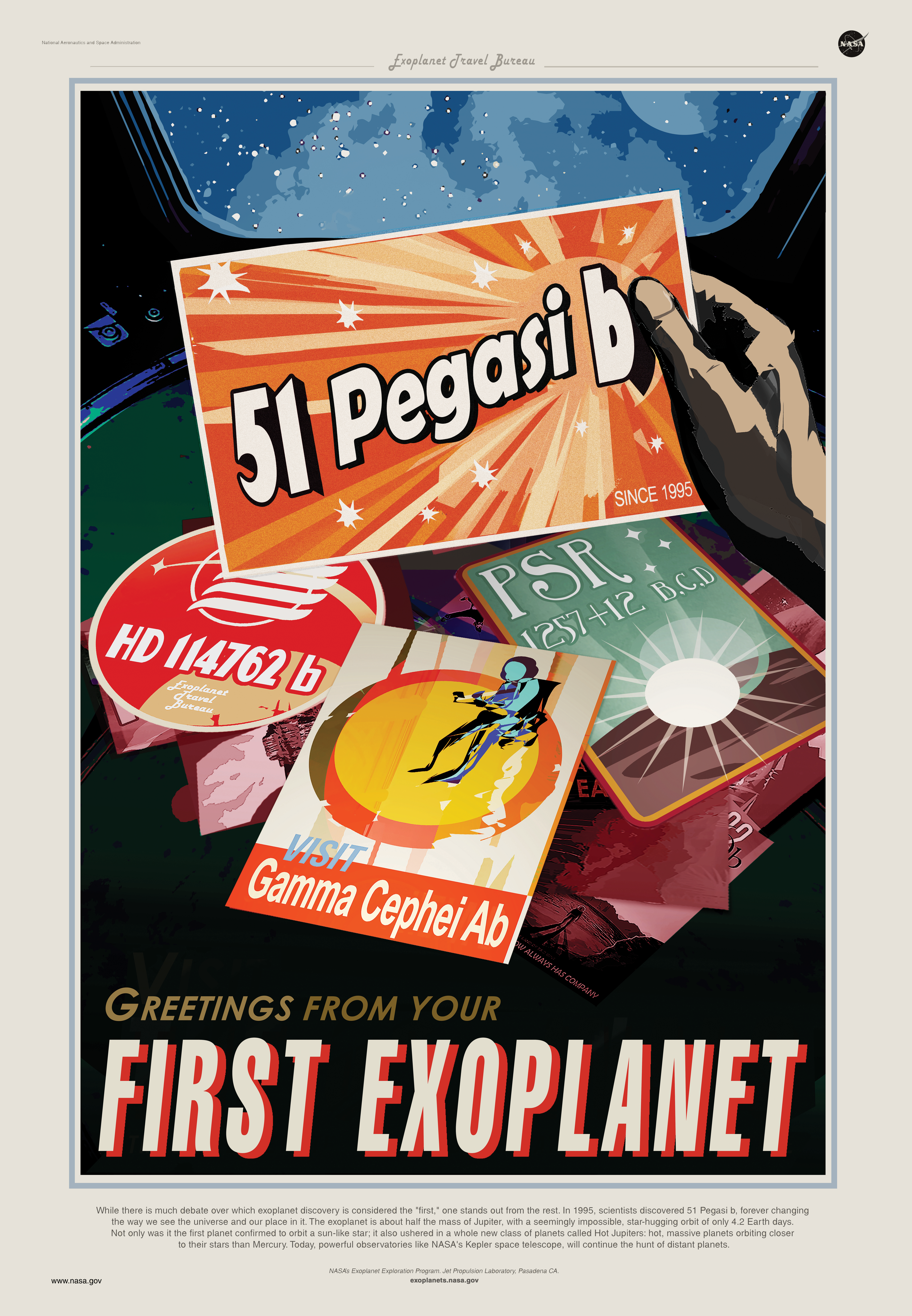
Promotional "Exoplanet Travel Bureau" poster from NASA

After its discovery, many teams confirmed the planet's existence and obtained more observations of its properties. It was discovered that the planet orbits the star in around four days. It is much closer to it than Mercury is to the Sun, moves at an orbital speed of 136 km/s (300,000 mph), yet has a minimum mass about half that of Jupiter (about 150 times that of the Earth). At the time, the presence of a huge world so close to its star was not compatible with theories of planet formation and was considered an anomaly. However, since then, numerous other "hot Jupiters" have been discovered (such as those orbiting 55 Cancri and τ Boötis), and astronomers are revising their theories of planet formation to account for them by studying orbital migration.

Assuming the planet is perfectly grey with no greenhouse or tidal effects, and a Bond albedo of 0.1, the temperature would be 1,265 K (992 °C; 1,817 °F). This is between the predicted temperatures of HD 189733 b and HD 209458 b (1,180 K [910 °C; 1,660 °F]–1,392 K [1,119 °C; 2,046 °F]), before they were measured.

In the report of the discovery, it was initially speculated that 51 Pegasi b was the stripped core of a brown dwarf of a decomposed star and was therefore composed of heavy elements, but it is now believed to be a gas giant. It is sufficiently massive that its thick atmosphere is not blown away by the star's solar wind.

51 Pegasi b probably has a greater radius than that of Jupiter despite its lower mass. This is because its superheated atmosphere must be puffed up into a thick but tenuous layer surrounding it. Beneath this, the gases that make up the planet would be so hot that the planet would glow red. Clouds of silicates may exist in the atmosphere.

The planet is tidally locked to its star, always presenting the same face to it.

The planet (with Upsilon Andromedae b) was deemed a candidate for aperture polarimetry by Planetpol. It is also a candidate for "near-infrared characterisation... with the VLTI Spectro-Imager".

== Claims of direct detection of visible light ==
A 2015 study alleged the detection of 51 Pegasi b in the visible light spectrum using the High Accuracy Radial Velocity Planet Searcher (HARPS) instrument at the European Southern Observatory's La Silla Observatory in Chile. This detection, if confirmed, would allow the inference of a true mass of 0.46 Jupiter masses. The findings also could suggest a high albedo for the planet, hence a large radius up to 1.9±0.3 Jupiter radii, which could suggest 51 Pegasi b is an inflated hot Jupiter. The optical detection could not be replicated in 2021, implying the planet has an albedo below 0.15. Measurements in 2021 have marginally detected a polarized reflected light signal, which, while they cannot place limits on the albedo without assumptions made about the scattering mechanisms, could suggest a high albedo.

A 2022 study found no evidence of reflected light, ruling out the previous radii and albedo estimates from previous studies. Instead, 51 Pegasi b is likely a low-albedo planet with a radius around 1.2±0.1 R_{J}.

== See also ==
- PSR B1257+12 B
- PSR B1257+12 C
- HD 209458 b
- List of exoplanets discovered before 2000
- List of exoplanet firsts
