= Swiss 1.2-metre Leonhard Euler Telescope =

Telescope in the La Silla Observatory, Chile

Leonhard Euler Telescope
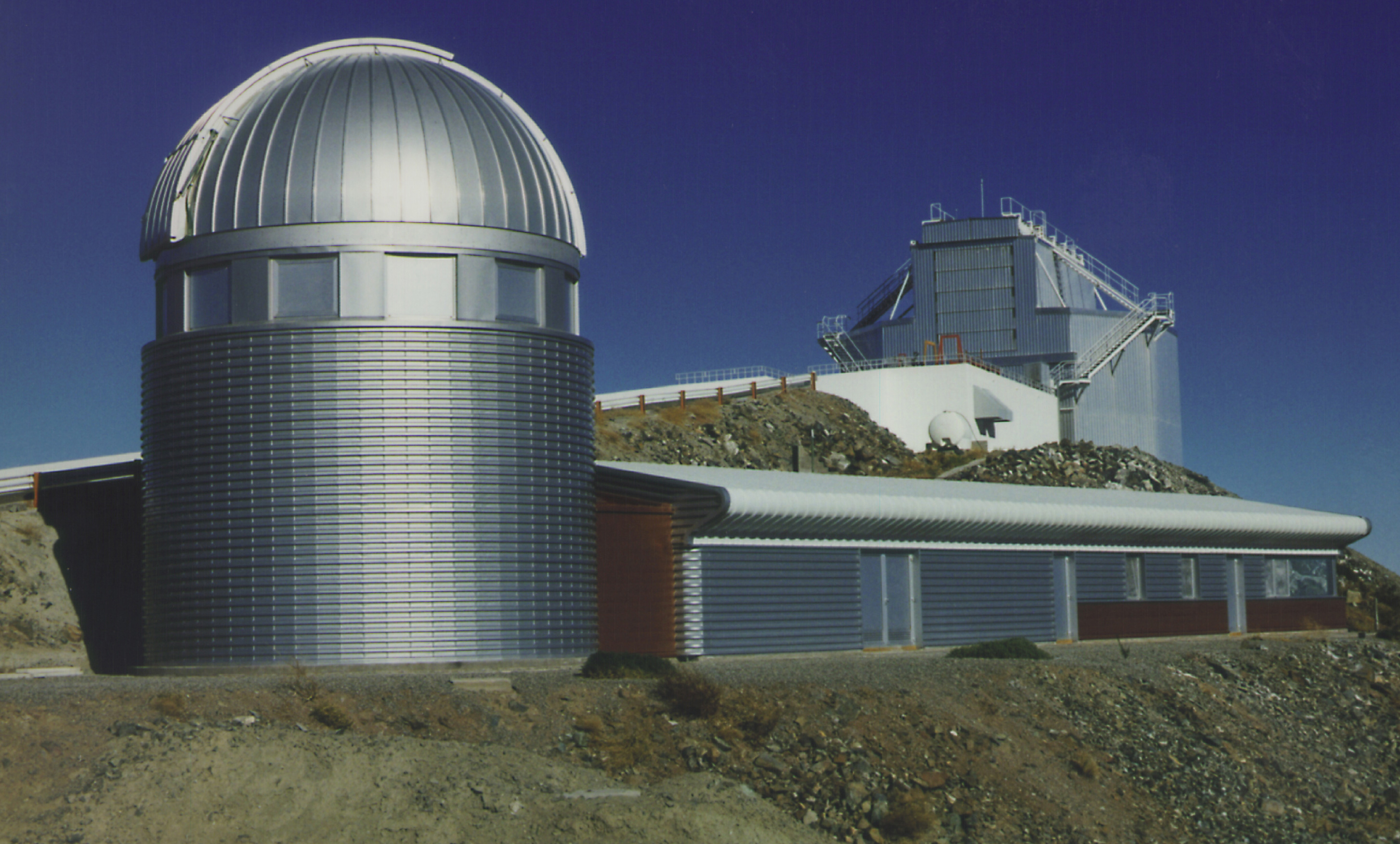
- The enclosure of the Leonhard Euler Telescope with the higher situated New Technology Telescope in the background
- Alternative names: Swiss 1.2-m Leonhard Euler Telescope
- Location: Norte Chico
- Coordinates: 29°15′34″S 70°43′59″W
- Diameter: 1.2 m (3 ft 11 in)
- Location within Chile
- Related media on Commons

Leonhard Euler Telescope, or the Swiss EULER Telescope, is a national, fully automatic 1.2-metre (47 in) reflecting telescope, built and operated by the Geneva Observatory. It is located at an altitude of 2,375 m (7,792 ft) at ESO's La Silla Observatory site in the Chilean Norte Chico region, about 460 kilometers north of Santiago de Chile. The telescope, which saw its first light on 12 April 1998, is named after Swiss mathematician Leonhard Paul Euler.

The Euler telescope uses the CORALIE instrument to search for exoplanets. In addition, the telescope uses the multi-purpose EulerCam (ecam), a high precision photometry instrument, and a smaller, piggyback mounted telescope, called "Pisco". Its first discovery was a planet in orbit around Gliese 86, determined to be a hot Jupiter with an orbital period of only 15.8 earth days and about four times the mass of Jupiter. Since then, many other exoplanets have been discovered or examined in follow-up observations.

Together with the Mercator Telescope, Euler was part of the Southern Sky extrasolar Planet search Programme, which has discovered numerous extrasolar planets. It has also been frequently employed for follow-up characterization to determine the mass of exoplanets discovered by the Wide Angle Search for Planets, SuperWASP.

== CORALIE ==
The CORALIE spectrograph is an echelle- type spectrograph used for astronomy. It is a copy of the ELODIE spectrograph used by Michel Mayor and Didier Queloz to detect the planet orbiting a star . In April 1998 it was built and installed at the Euler Telescope. Later in 2007 it was upgraded by Didier Queloz and his team to increase its performances to support Wide Angle Search for Planets program and Next-Generation Transit Survey. The instrument is optimized to measure Doppler effect on a star's electromagnetic spectrum with great precision to detect the gravitational tug of an exoplanet orbiting around it. It also known as "radial velocity" or "wobble" method, is an indirect detection method. The mass of the planet can be estimated from these measurements.

The spectrograph participates in the Southern Sky extrasolar Planet search Programme initiated by Michel Mayor

In 2010 visible camera EulerCam was installed by Didier Queloz. Camera main objective was to measure planet by transit method by supporting ground base program such as Wide Angle Search for Planets . The size of an exoplanet can be estimated using the transit method. By combining the measured size and mass from both methods, it can be determined whether the observed exoplanet is gaseous or rocky.

=== Characteristics ===
The resolution of CORALIE is fixed at R = 50,000 with three-pixel sampling. The detector charge-coupled device is 2k X 2k with a 15 micrometer pixel size.

=== Discovered exoplanets ===
The first five planetary object discovered using CORALIE are

| Planet | Announced in | Refs |
|---|---|---|
| Gliese 86 b | 1998 | |
| HD 75289 b | 1999 | |
| Eiger | 1999 | |
| Beirut | 1999 | |
| GJ 3021 b | 2000 | |

== Gallery ==
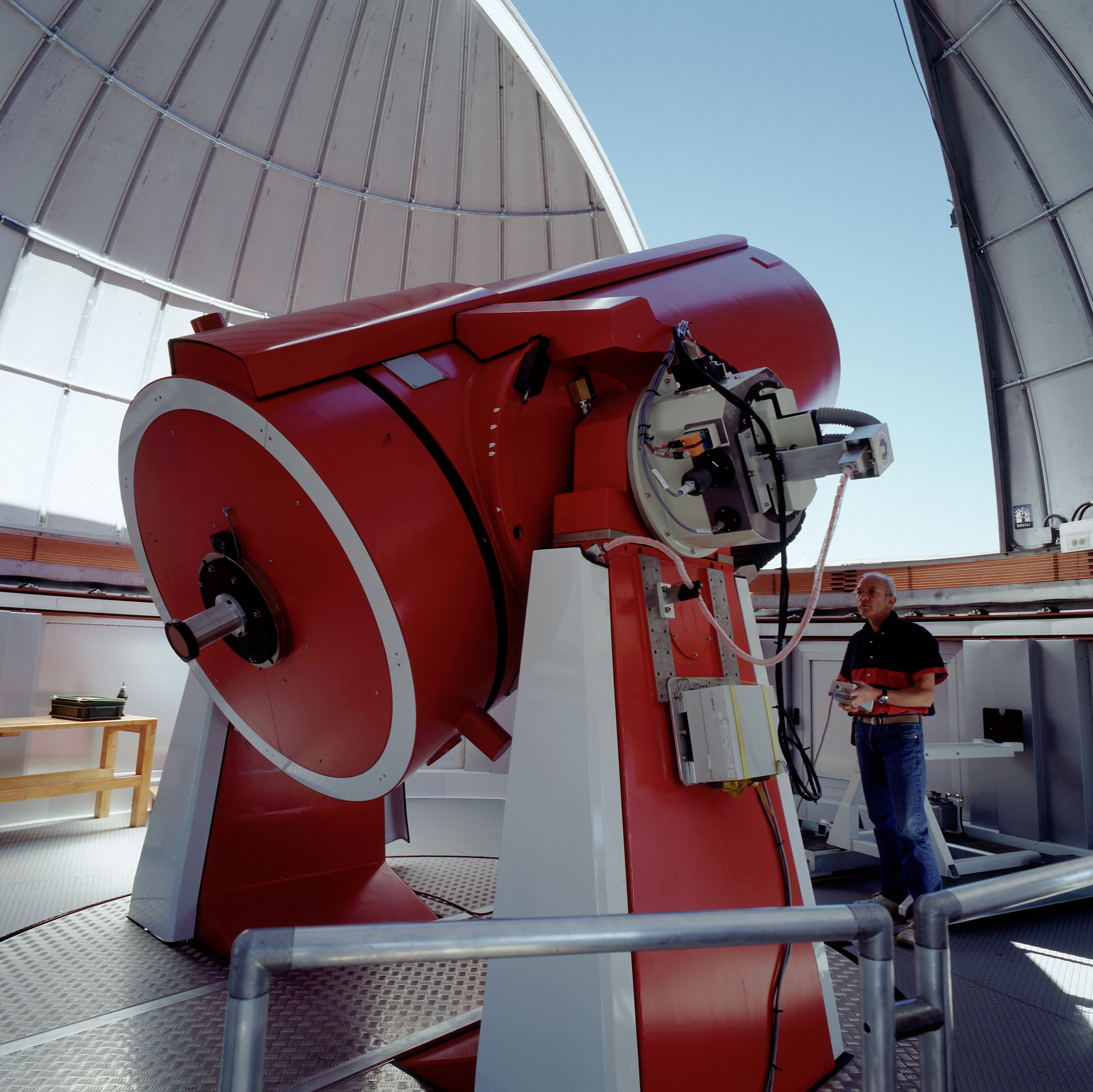
The 1.2-meter Leonhard Euler Telescope

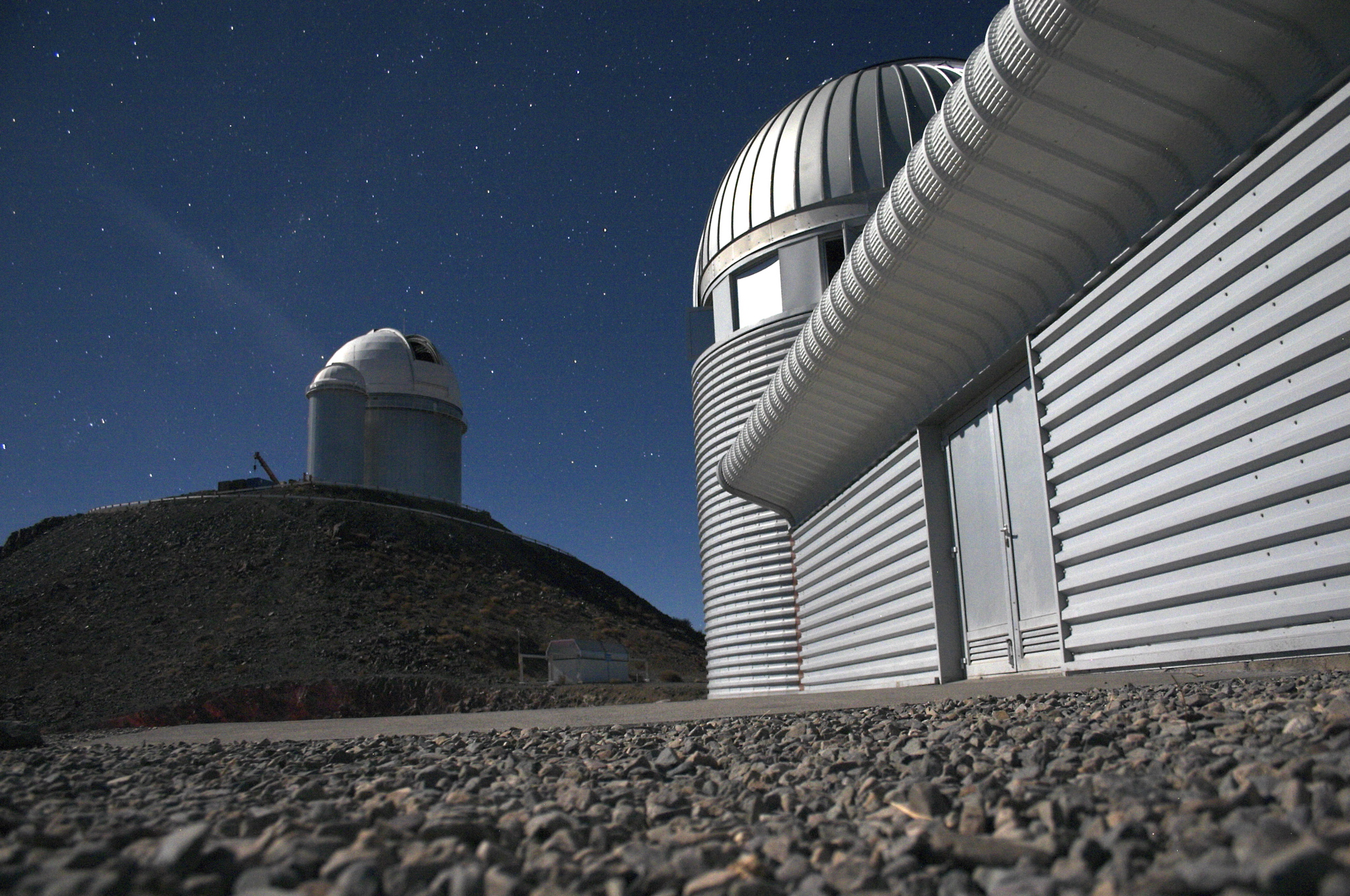
Euler Telescope with the ESO 3.6-meter in the background

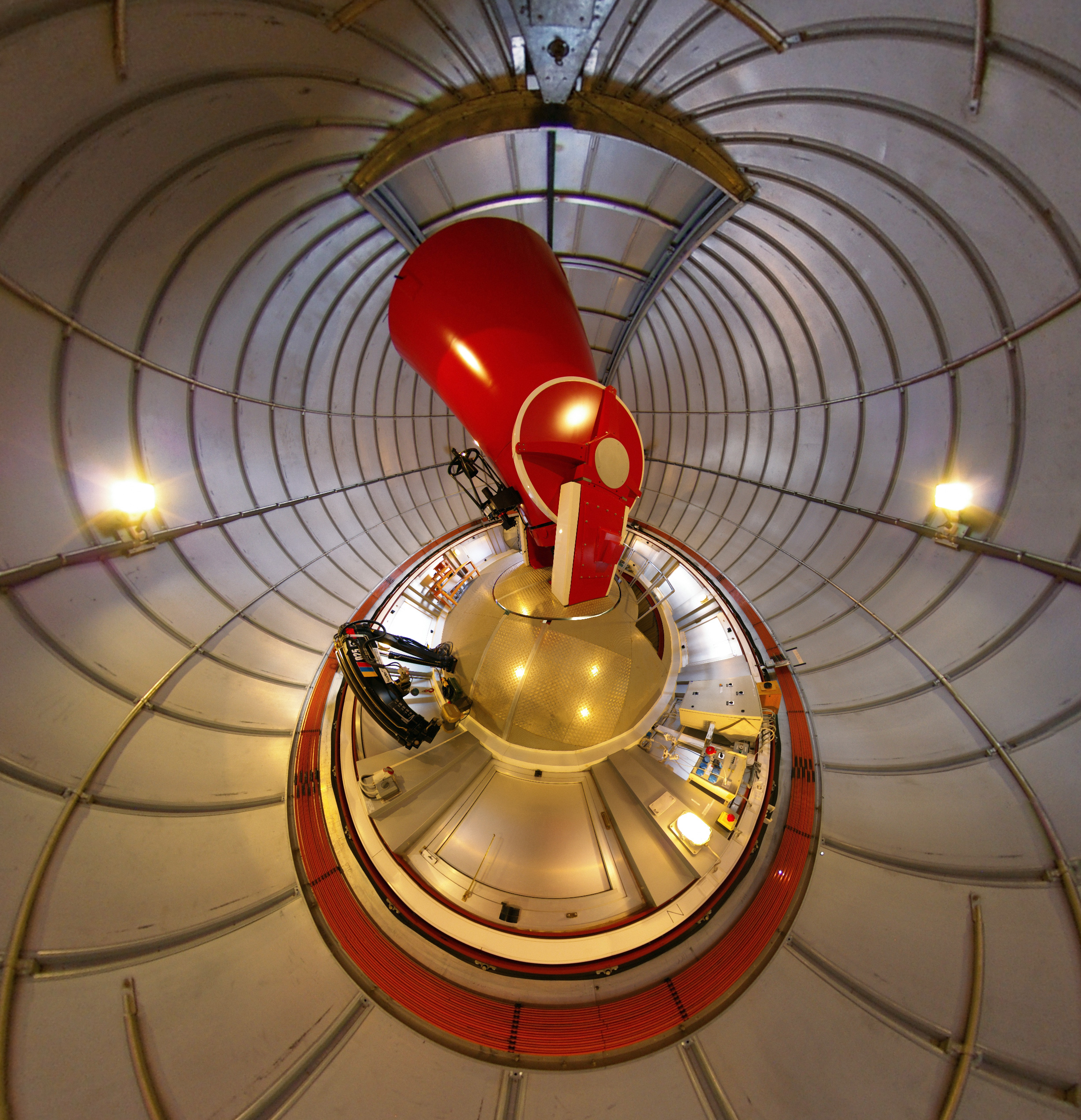
A fisheye view of the Euler Telescope

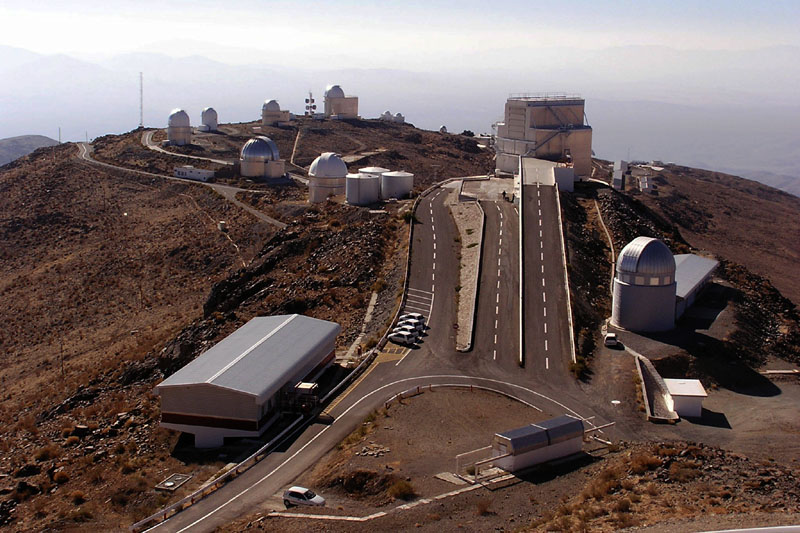
La Silla with NTT in the center and Euler on the right

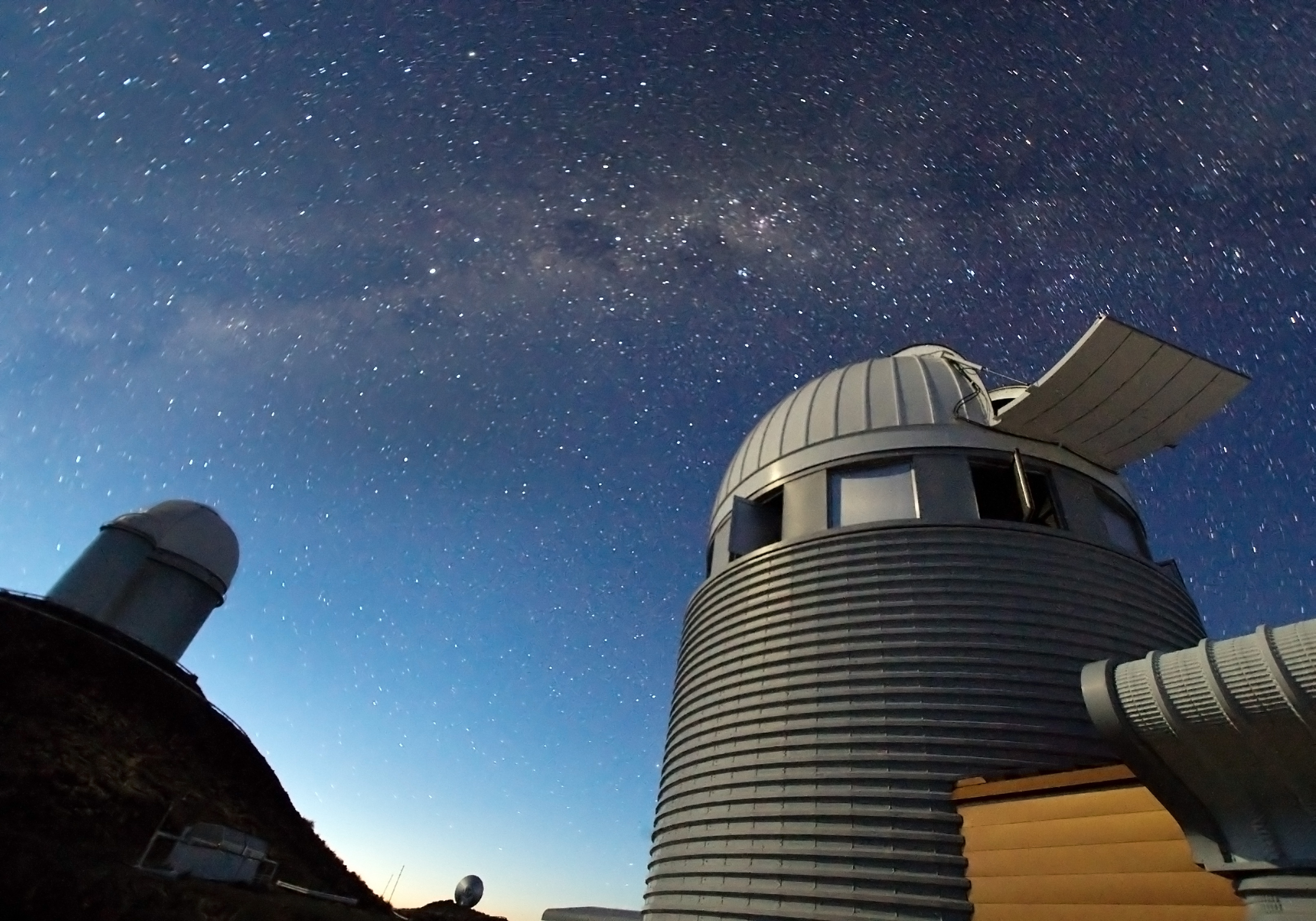
Euler and ESO 3.6-meter are both exoplanet hunters at La Silla

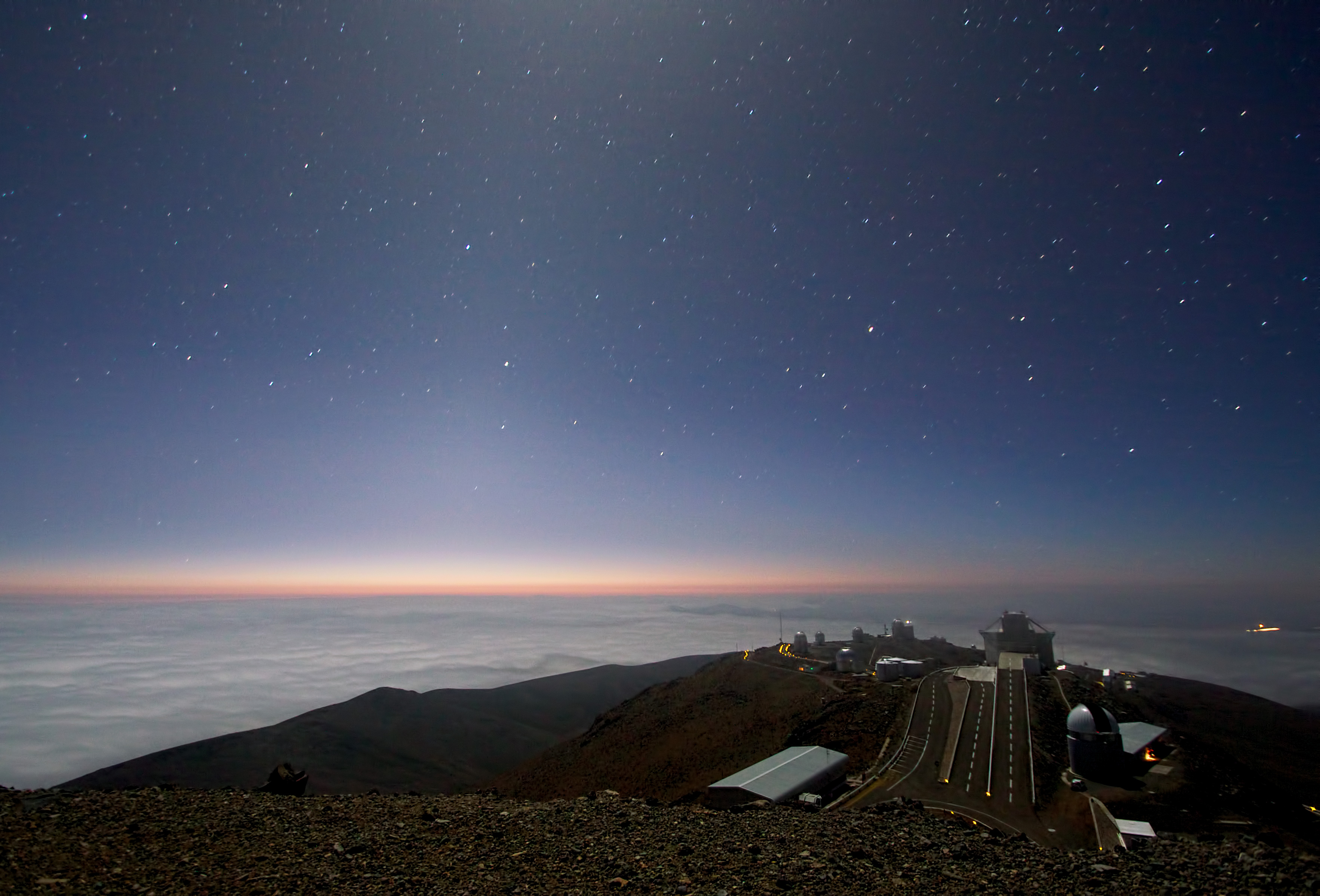
Moonlight and Zodiacal Light Over La Silla Observatory

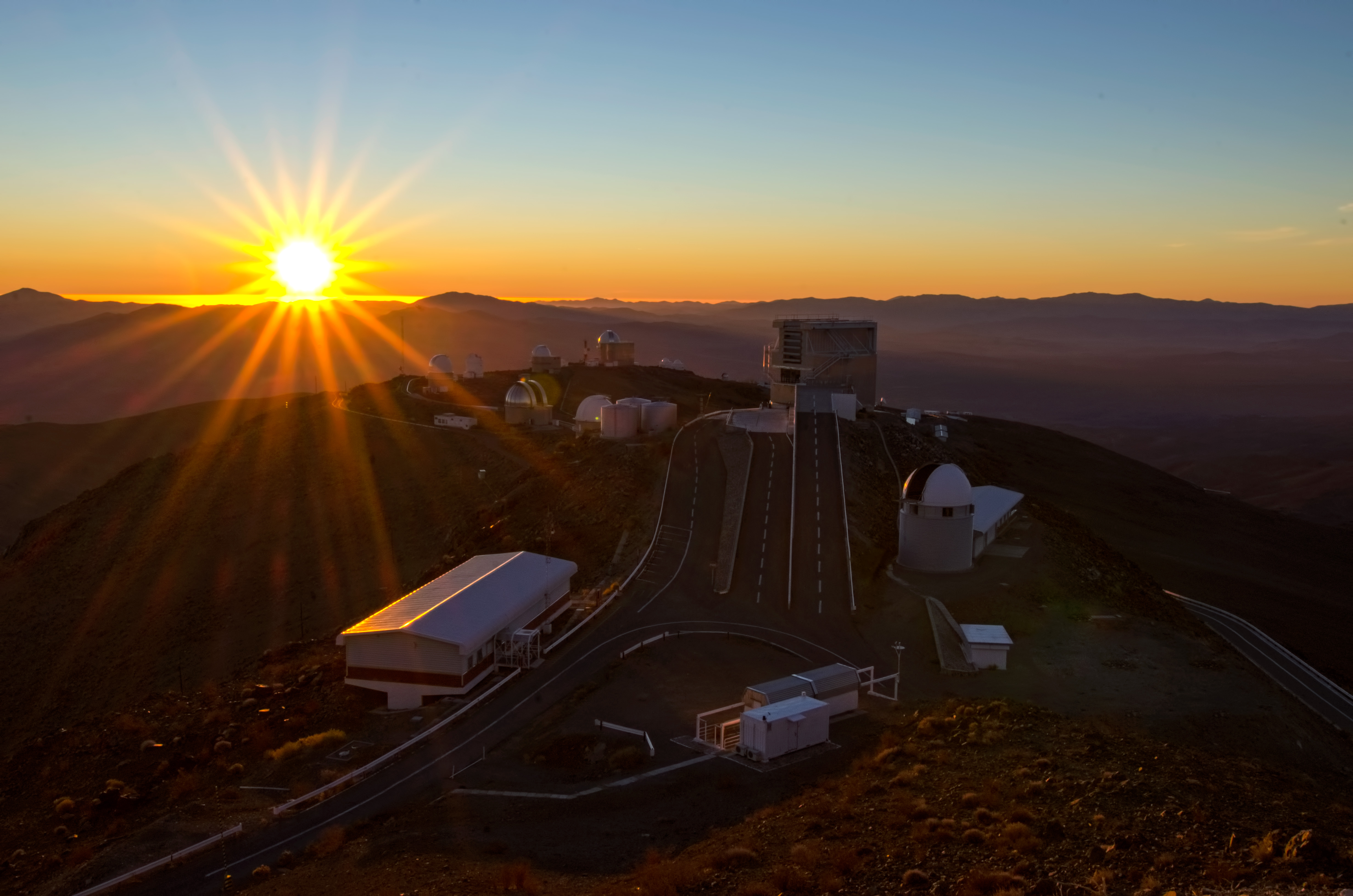
Sunset at ESO's La Silla observatory in Chile

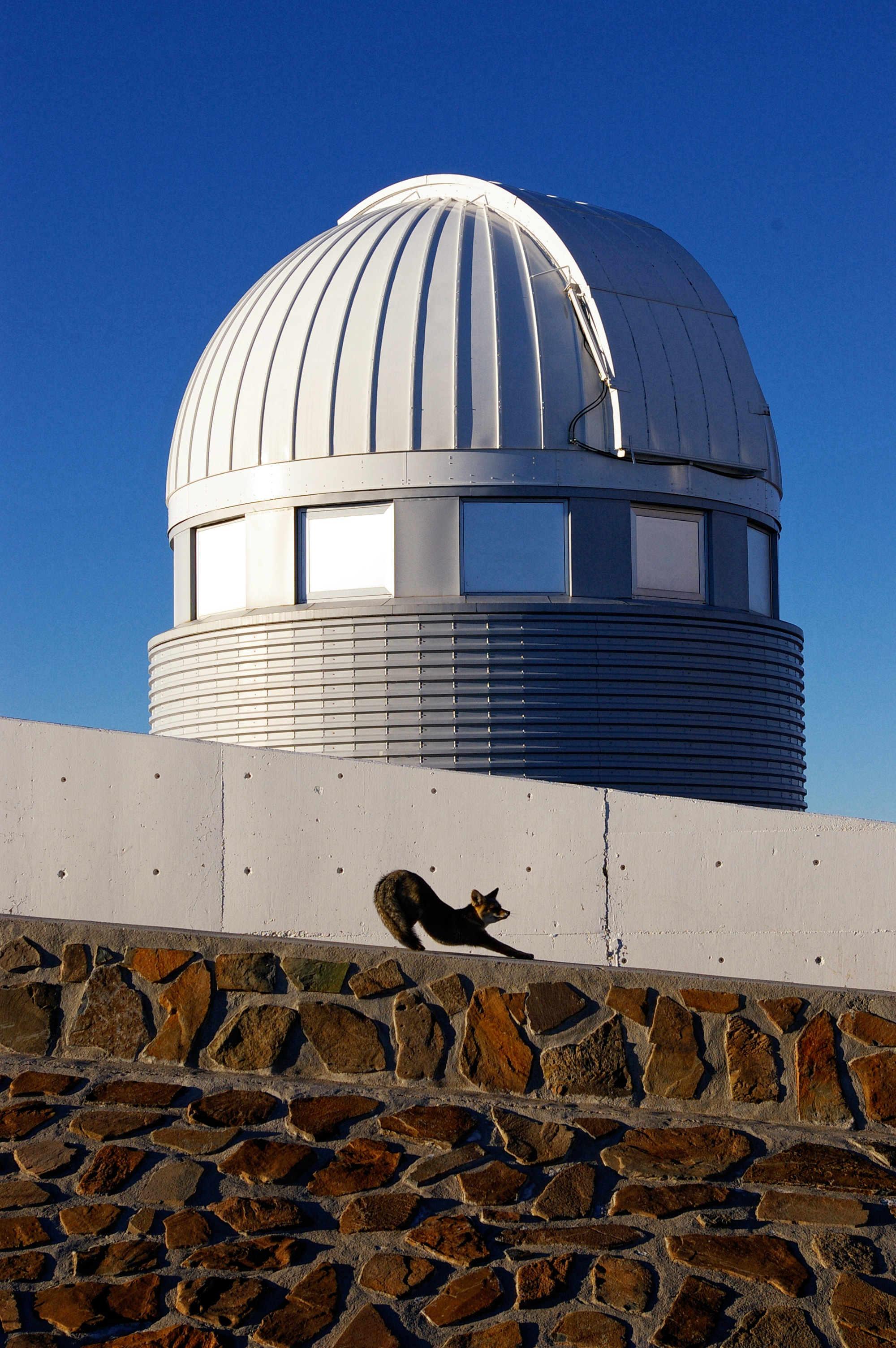
Fantastic Mr Fox

=== Video ===
Timelapse video of Euler and the NTT observing the night sky

== See also ==
- ELODIE spectrograph
- List of largest optical telescopes in the 20th century
- Stéphane Udry
- WASP-15
