= Michel Mayor =

Swiss astrophysicist & Nobel laureate of Physics

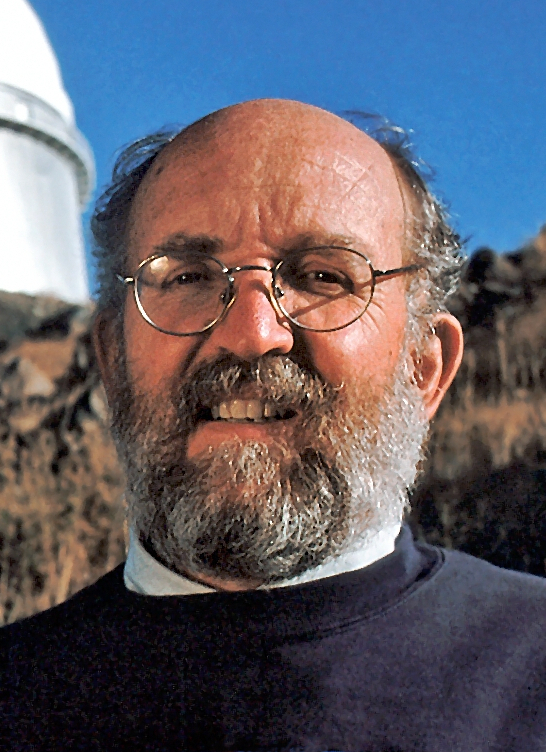
- Mayor in 2012
- Born: Michel Gustave Édouard Mayor; 12 January 1942 (age 84); Lausanne, Switzerland
- Education: University of Lausanne (MS); University of Geneva (PhD)
- Known for: Discovered first planet orbiting around a normal star, 51 Pegasi
- Awards: Prix Jules Janssen (1998); Albert Einstein Medal(2004); Shaw Prize (2005); Kyoto Prize in Basic Sciences (2015); Wolf Prize (2017); Nobel Prize in Physics (2019)
- Scientific career
- Fields: Astrophysics
- Workplaces: University of Geneva
- Thesis: "The kinematical properties of stars in the solar vicinity: possible relation with the galactic spiral structure" (1971)
- Doctoral students: Didier Queloz

Michel Gustave Édouard Mayor (French pronunciation: [miʃɛl majɔʁ]; born 12 January 1942) is a Swiss astrophysicist and professor emeritus at the University of Geneva's Department of Astronomy. He formally retired in 2007, but remains active as a researcher at the Observatory of Geneva. He is co-laureate of the 2019 Nobel Prize in Physics along with Jim Peebles and Didier Queloz, and the winner of the 2010 Viktor Ambartsumian International Prize and the 2015 Kyoto Prize.

Together with Didier Queloz in 1995, he discovered 51 Pegasi b, the first extrasolar planet orbiting a sun-like star, 51 Pegasi. For this achievement, they were awarded the 2019 Nobel Prize in Physics "for the discovery of an exoplanet orbiting a solar-type star" resulting in "contributions to our understanding of the evolution of the universe and Earth's place in the cosmos". Related to the discovery, Mayor noted that humans will never migrate to such exoplanets since they are "much, much too far away ... [and would take] hundreds of millions of days using the means we have available today". However, due to discoveries by Mayor, searching for extraterrestrial communications from exoplanets may now be a more practical consideration than thought earlier.

== Education and career ==
Mayor obtained an MS degree in Physics from the University of Lausanne (1966) and a PhD in Astronomy from the Geneva Observatory in 1971. He was a researcher at the Institute of Astronomy at the University of Cambridge in 1971. Subsequently, he spent sabbatical semesters at the European Southern Observatory (ESO) in northern Chile and at the Institute for Astronomy of the University of Hawaiʻi System.

From 1971 to 1984, Mayor worked as a research associate at the Observatory of Geneva, which is home to the astronomy department of the University of Geneva. He became an associate professor at the university in 1984. In 1988, the university named him a full professor, a position he held until his retirement in 2007. Mayor was director of the Observatory of Geneva from 1998 to 2004. He is a professor emeritus at the University of Geneva.

== Research ==
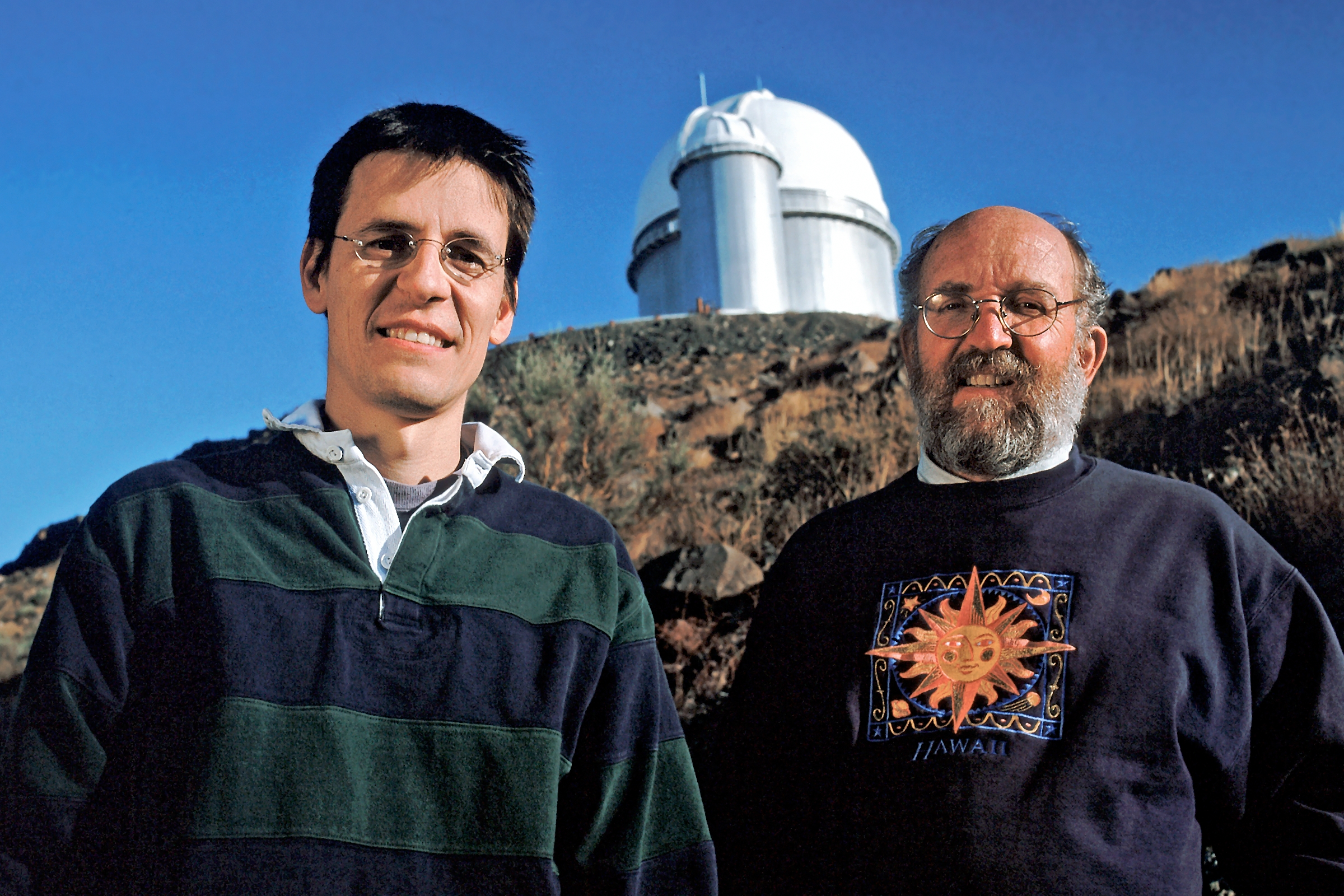
Didier Queloz and Michel Mayor at the La Silla Observatory (2012)

Video: Michel Mayor speaks about the discovery of exoplanets (after 2:07)

Mayor's research interests include extrasolar planets (also known as exoplanets), instrumentation, statistical properties of double stars, globular cluster dynamics, galactic structure and kinematics. Mayor's doctoral thesis at the University of Geneva was devoted to the spiral structure of galaxies.

During his time as a research associate, there had been strong interest in developing photoelectric-based Doppler spectrometers to obtain more accurate measurements of radial velocities of stellar objects compared to existing photographic methods. Following preliminary work by Roger Griffin in 1967 to show the feasibility of photoelectric measurements of radial velocities, Mayor worked with André Baranne at the Marseille Observatory to develop CORAVEL, a photoelectric spectrometer capable of highly accurate radial velocity measurements, which allow measurement of star movements, orbital periods of binary stars, and even the rotational speed of stars.

This research led to various fields of interest, including the study of statistical characteristics of solar-type binary stars. With fellow researcher Antoine Duquennoy, they examined the radial velocities of several systems believed to be binary stars in 1991. Their results found that a subset of these may in fact be single star systems with substellar secondary objects. Desiring more accurate radial velocity measurements, Mayor, along with Baranne at Marseille, and with graduate student Didier Queloz, developed ELODIE, a new spectrograph based on the work of CORAVEL, which was estimated to have an accuracy of 15 m/s for bright stars, improving upon the 1 km/s from CORAVEL. ELODIE was developed with the specific intent to determine if the substellar secondary objects were brown dwarf stars or potentially giant planets.

By 1994, ELODIE was operational at Geneva and Mayor and Queloz began their survey of Sun-like systems with suspected substellar secondary objects. In July 1995, the pair's survey of 51 Pegasi affirmed that there was an exoplanet orbiting it, identified as 51 Pegasi b, which was later classified as a hot-Jupiter–type planet. This was the first exoplanet to be found orbiting a main-sequence star, as opposed to planets that orbited the remains of a star. Mayor's and Queloz's discovery of an exoplanet launched great interest is searching for other exoplanets since. On 21 March 2022, the 5000th exoplanet beyond the Solar System was confirmed.

Mayor's work focused more on improving instrumentation for radial velocity measurements to improve detecting exoplanets and measuring their properties. Mayor led a team to further improve ELODIE to increase velocity measurement accuracy to 1 m/s via the High Accuracy Radial Velocity Planet Searcher (HARPS) installed on the ESO 3.6 m Telescope at La Silla Observatory in Chile by 2003. Mayor led the team that used HARPS to seek out other exoplanets. In 2007, Mayor was one of 11 European scientists who discovered Gliese 581c, the first extrasolar planet in a star's habitable zone, from the ESO telescope. In 2009, Mayor and his team discovered the lightest exoplanet ever detected around a main sequence star: Gliese 581e. Nonetheless, Mayor noted that humans will never migrate to such exoplanets since they are "much, much too far away ... [and would take] hundreds of millions of days using the means we have available today". However, due to discoveries by Mayor, searching for extraterrestrial communications from exoplanets may now be a more practical consideration than thought earlier.

== Awards and distinctions ==
In 1998, Mayor was awarded the Swiss Marcel Benoist Prize in recognition of his work and its significance for human life. As of 2003, he was a member of the board of trustees. He received the Prix Jules Janssen from the Société astronomique de France (French Astronomical Society) in 1998.

In 2000, he was awarded the Balzan Prize. Four years later, he was awarded the Albert Einstein Medal. In 2005, he received the Shaw Prize in Astronomy, along with American astrophysicist Geoffrey Marcy. Mayor was made a knight of the French Legion d'Honneur in 2004.

In collaboration with Pierre-Yves Frei, Mayor wrote a book in French called Les Nouveaux mondes du Cosmos (Seuil, 260 pages), which was awarded the Livre de l'astronomie 2001 prize by the 17th Astronomy Festival Haute Maurienne.

Mayor has received honorary doctorate degrees from eight universities: Katholieke Universiteit Leuven (Belgium), 2001; École Polytechnique Fédérale de Lausanne (EPFL) (Lausanne, Switzerland) (2002); Federal University of Rio Grande do Norte (Brazil), 2006; Uppsala University (Sweden), 2007; Paris Observatory (France), 2008; Université Libre de Bruxelles (Belgium), 2009; University of Provence (Marseille, France), 2011, and Université Joseph Fourier (Grenoble, France), 2014.

Mayor has received the 2011 BBVA Foundation Frontiers of Knowledge Award of Basic Sciences (together with his former student Didier Queloz) for developing new astronomical instruments and experimental techniques that led to the first observation of planets around Sun-like stars. Asteroid 125076 Michelmayor, discovered by Swiss amateur astronomer Michel Ory at the Jura Observatory in 2001, was named in his honor. The official naming citation was published by the Minor Planet Center on 21 August 2013 (M.P.C. 84674).

In 2015, he was awarded the Gold Medal of the Royal Astronomical Society, and the Kyoto Prize in Basic Sciences. In 2017, he received the Wolf Prize in Physics. He and Didier Queloz (also from Switzerland) were awarded one half of the 2019 Nobel Prize in Physics for the discovery of the exoplanet 51 Pegasi b.

== Participation in professional associations ==
- Publisher and organizer of nine Saas-Fee Advanced Courses of the Swiss Society of Astrophysics and Astronomy
- Member of the editorial board of Europhysics News, 1985–1990
- Swiss delegate for the European Space Agency (ESA)'s Astronomical Working Group, 1985–1987
- President of the International Astronomical Union (IAU)'s Commission 33 on the "Structure and dynamics of the galactic system, 1988–1991
- Chairman of the European Southern Observatory's Scientific Technical Committee, 1990–1992
- President of the Swiss Society of Astrophysics and Astronomy (SAAS), 1990–1993
- Member of the organizing committee of the IAU Commission on Bioastronomy, 1997–2003
- Swiss delegate to the European Southern Observatory (ESO) Council, 2003–2007
- President of the IAU commission on extra-solar planets, 2006–2009
- Foreign Associate of the French Academy of Sciences (Académie des sciences), 2003
- Honorary Fellow of the Royal Astronomical Society (UK), 2008
- Foreign member of the National Academy of Sciences (US), 2010
- Foreign member of the American Academy of Arts and Sciences, 2010
