= Exoplanet naming convention =

Current system of naming exoplanets

The exoplanet naming convention is an extension of the system used for naming multiple-star systems as adopted by the International Astronomical Union (IAU). For exoplanets orbiting a single star, the name is normally formed by taking the name of its parent star and adding a lowercase letter. A provisional IAU-sanctioned standard exists to accommodate the naming of planets that orbit two stars, which are known as circumbinary planets. A limited number of exoplanets have IAU-sanctioned proper names. Other naming systems exist.

== Exoplanet naming standard ==
The convention for naming exoplanets is an extension of the one used by the Washington Multiplicity Catalog (WMC) for multiple-star systems, and adopted by the International Astronomical Union.

In the WMC naming system, the brightest member of a star system receives the letter "A". Distinct components not contained within "A" are labeled "B", "C", etc. Subcomponents are designated by one or more suffixes with the primary label, starting with lowercase letters for the second hierarchical level and then numbers for the third. For example, if there is a triple star system in which two stars orbit each other closely with a third star in a more distant orbit, the two closely orbiting stars would be named Aa and Ab, whereas the distant star would be named B. For historical reasons, this standard is not always followed: for example Alpha Centauri A, B and C are not labelled Alpha Centauri Aa, Ab and B.

Following an extension of the above standard, an exoplanet's name is normally formed by taking the name of its parent star and adding a lowercase letter. The first planet discovered in a system is given the designation "b" (the parent star is considered to be "a") and later planets are given subsequent letters. If several planets in the same system are discovered at the same time, the closest one to the star gets the next letter, followed by the other planets in order of orbital size.

The orbits of the planets 55 Cancri e, 55 Cancri b, 55 Cancri c and 55 Cancri f

For instance, in the 55 Cancri system the first planet – 55 Cancri b – was discovered in 1996; two additional farther planets were simultaneously discovered in 2002 with the nearest to the star being named 55 Cancri c and the other 55 Cancri d; a fourth planet was claimed (its existence was later disputed) in 2004 and named 55 Cancri e despite lying closer to the star than 55 Cancri b; and the most recently discovered planet, in 2007, was named 55 Cancri f despite lying between 55 Cancri c and 55 Cancri d. As of April 2012 the highest letter in use is "j", for the unconfirmed planet HD 10180 j, and, as of July 2020, with "i" being the highest letter for a confirmed planet (Kepler-90i).

If a planet orbits one member of a binary star system, then an uppercase letter for the star will be followed by a lowercase letter for the planet. Examples are 16 Cygni Bb and HD 178911 Bb. Planets orbiting the primary or "A" star should have 'Ab' after the name of the system, as in HD 41004 Ab. However, the "A" is sometimes omitted; for example the first planet discovered around the primary star of the Tau Boötis binary system is usually called simply Tau Boötis b. The star designation is necessary when more than one star in the system has its own planetary system such as in case of WASP-94 A and WASP-94 B.

If the parent star is a single star, then it may still be regarded as having an "A" designation, though the "A" is not normally written. The first exoplanet found to be orbiting such a star could then be regarded as a secondary subcomponent that should be given the suffix "Ab". For example, 51 Peg Aa is the host star in the system 51 Peg; and the first exoplanet is then 51 Peg Ab. Because most exoplanets are in single-star systems, the implicit "A" designation was simply dropped, leaving the exoplanet name with the lower-case letter only: 51 Peg b.

A few exoplanets have been given names that do not conform to the above standard. For example, the planets that orbit the pulsar PSR 1257 are often referred to with capital rather than lowercase letters. Also, the underlying name of the star system itself can follow several different systems. In fact, some stars (such as Kepler-11) have only received their names due to their inclusion in planet-search programs, previously only being referred to by their celestial coordinates.

== Circumbinary planets and 2010 proposal ==
According to Hessman et al., the implicit system for exoplanet names "utterly failed with the discovery of circumbinary planets", and they state that it is unhelpful. They note that the discoverers of the two planets around HW Virginis tried to circumvent the naming problem by calling them "HW Vir 3" and "HW Vir 4", i.e. the latter is the 4th object – stellar or planetary – discovered in the system. They also note that the discoverers of the two planets around NN Serpentis were confronted with multiple suggestions from various official sources and finally chose to use the designations "NN Ser c" and "NN Ser d".

The proposal of Hessman et al. starts with the following two rules:

Rule 1. The formal name of an exoplanet is obtained by appending the appropriate suffixes to the formal name of the host star or stellar system. The upper hierarchy is defined by uppercase letters, followed by lower-case letters, followed by numbers, etc. The naming order within a hierarchical level is for the order of discovery only. (This rule corresponds to the present provisional WMC naming convention.)
Rule 2. Whenever the leading capital letter designation is missing, this is interpreted as being an informal form with an implicit "A" unless otherwise explicitly stated. (This rule corresponds to the present exoplanet community usage for planets around single stars.)

They note that under these two proposed rules all of the present names for 99% of the planets around single stars are preserved as informal forms of the IAU sanctioned provisional standard. They would rename Tau Boötis b formally as Tau Boötis Ab, retaining the prior form as an informal usage (using Rule 2, above).

To deal with the difficulties relating to circumbinary planets, the proposal contains two further rules:

Rule 3. As an alternative to the nomenclature standard in Rule 1, a hierarchical relationship can be expressed by concatenating the names of the higher order system and placing them in parentheses, after which the suffix for a lower order system is added.
Rule 4. When in doubt (i.e. if a different name has not been clearly set in the literature), the hierarchy expressed by the nomenclature should correspond to dynamically distinct (sub)systems in order of their dynamical relevance. The choice of hierarchical levels should be made to emphasize dynamical relationships, if known.

They submit that the new form using parentheses is the best for known circumbinary planets and has the desirable effect of giving these planets identical sublevel hierarchical labels and stellar component names that conform to the usage for binary stars. They say that it requires the complete renaming of only two exoplanetary systems: The planets around HW Virginis would be renamed HW Vir (AB)b & (AB)c, whereas those around NN Serpentis would be renamed NN Ser (AB)b & (AB)c. In addition the previously known single circumbinary planets around PSR B1620-26 and DP Leonis can almost retain their names (PSR B1620-26 b and DP Leonis b) as unofficial informal forms of the "(AB)b" designation where the "(AB)" is left out.

The discoverers of the circumbinary planet around Kepler-16 followed the naming scheme proposed by Hessman et al. when naming the body Kepler-16 (AB)b, or simply Kepler-16b when there is no ambiguity.

== Proper names ==
The proper names of the four innermost planets orbiting 55 Cancri

Most exoplanets have catalog names that are explained in the preceding sections, but in July 2014 the IAU launched NameExoWorlds, a process for giving proper names to exoplanets. The process involved public nomination and voting for the new names, the results of which were announced in December 2015. The planets so named were AEgir (Note: There is some question on whether the name should be spelled Ægir (with an æ ligature), but the official press release from the IAU says AEgir. Until a superseding document from the IAU changes the typography, the current spelling is correct.), Amateru, Arion, Arkas, Brahe, Dagon, Dimidium, Draugr, Dulcinea, Fortitudo, Galileo, Harriot, Hypatia, Janssen, Lipperhey, Majriti, Meztli, Orbitar, Phobetor, Poltergeist, Quijote, Rocinante, Saffar, Samh, Smertrios, Sancho, Spe, Tadmor, Taphao Kaew, Taphao Thong and Thestias.

The decision to give the planets new names followed the private company Uwingu's exoplanet naming contest, which the IAU harshly criticized. Previously a few planets had received unofficial names: notably Osiris (HD 209458 b), Bellerophon (51 Pegasi b), and Methuselah (PSR B1620-26 b).

In 2019 the IAU gave every country in the world the chance to name an exoplanet and its host star via national competitions. The results were announced in December 2019.

== Other naming systems ==
Another nomenclature, often seen in science fiction, uses Roman numerals in the order of planets' positions from the star. (This was inspired by an old system for naming moons of the outer planets, such as "Jupiter IV" for Callisto.)
