= 70 Virginis b =

Jovian planet orbiting 70 Virginis

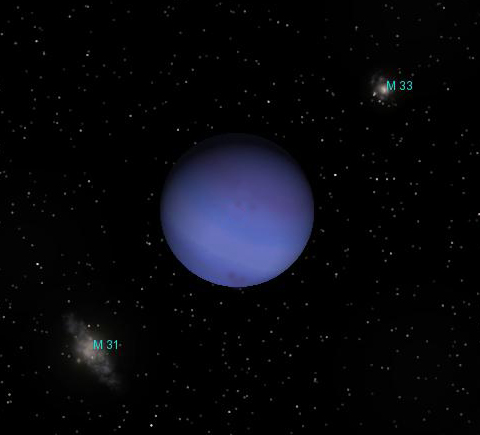
- The exoplanet 70 Virginis b (min mass ~7.5 MJ) as rendered by Celestia

Discovery
- Discovered by: Geoffrey Marcy; R. Paul Butler
- Discovery site: United States
- Discovery date: 17 January 1996
- Detection method: Doppler Spectroscopy

Orbital characteristics
- Semi-major axis: 0.481 ± 0.003 AU (71,960,000 ± 450,000 km)
- Eccentricity: 0.399±0.002
- Orbital period (sidereal): 116.6926±0.0014 d
- Time of periastron: 7239.7±0.1
- Argument of periastron: 358.8±0.3
- Semi-amplitude: 315.7±0.7
- Star: 70 Virginis

Physical characteristics
- Mean radius: ~1 R_{J}
- Mass: ≥7.40±0.02 M_{J}

70 Virginis b (abbreviated 70 Vir b) is an extrasolar planet approximately 60 light-years away in the constellation of Virgo. Announced in 1996 by Geoffrey Marcy and R. Paul Butler, 70 Virginis was one of the first stars confirmed to have planets orbiting it. When first announced, 70 Virginis b was considered to be within its star's habitable zone (preferably in the "Goldilocks zone"), but it was later confirmed that the planet has an eccentric orbit, closer to its parent.

== Characteristics ==
Radial velocity changes over time of 70 Virginis caused by the orbit of 70 Virginis b.

70 Virginis b is a gas giant extrasolar planet that is 7.4 times the mass of Jupiter and is in an eccentric 116-day orbit about its host. Its surface gravity is expected to be about six to eight times that of Jupiter, while its radius is about the same as Jupiter's. At the time of discovery in January 1996, it was believed that the star was only 29 ly away resulting in the star being less luminous based on its apparent magnitude. As a result, the planet's orbit was thought to be in the habitable zone and the planet was nicknamed Goldilocks (not too cold or too hot).

The Hipparcos satellite later showed that the star was more distant from Earth and therefore brighter resulting in the planet being too hot to be in the habitable zone.

== See also ==
- 51 Pegasi b
- Tau Boötis b
- 55 Cancri b
- 47 Ursae Majoris b
- Upsilon Andromedae b
- List of exoplanets discovered before 2000
