= Naming of planets =

Naming of planets may refer to:

- Astronomical naming conventions § Planets, for the planets of the Solar System
- Planetary nomenclature, for features on those planets
- Exoplanet naming convention, for planets outside the Solar System
- Minor-planet designation, for initial designations of dwarf planets, asteroids etc.
  - Meanings of minor-planet names, for later names of those bodies
