= Mu Arae =

Star in the constellation Ara

Mu Arae / Cervantes
- The location of μ Arae (circled)

Observation data Epoch J2000 Equinox ICRS
- Constellation: Ara
- Right ascension: 17^{h} 44^{m} 08.70314^{s}
- Declination: −51° 50′ 02.5916″
- Apparent magnitude (V): 5.15

Characteristics
- Evolutionary stage: subgiant
- Spectral type: G3IV–V
- Apparent magnitude (V): 5.15±0.01
- Apparent magnitude (G): 4.943±0.003
- Apparent magnitude (K): 3.68±0.25
- U−B color index: +0.24
- B−V color index: +0.70

Astrometry
Radial velocity (R_{v})	−9.54±0.13 km/s
Proper motion (μ)	RA: −15.034 mas/yr Dec.: −190.901 mas/yr
Parallax (π)	64.0853±0.0904 mas
Distance	50.89 ± 0.07 ly (15.60 ± 0.02 pc)
Absolute magnitude (M_{V})	+4.17

Details
Mass	1.10±0.01 M_{☉}
Radius	1.280±0.025 R_{☉}
Luminosity	1.879±0.019 L_{☉}
Surface gravity (log g)	4.30±0.03 cgs
Temperature	5,974±61 K
Metallicity	200±5% (Note: From [Fe/H] = 0.30 ± 0.01)
Metallicity [Fe/H]	0.29±0.01 dex
Rotational velocity (v sin i)	3.1±0.5 km/s
Age	6.34±0.40 Gyr

Other designations
- Cervantes, μ Arae, CD−51°11094, FK5 662, GC 24024, GJ 691, HD 160691, HIP 86796, HR 6585, SAO 244981, PPM 346258, LTT 7053

Database references
SIMBAD	data
Exoplanet Archive	data
ARICNS	data

Mu Arae is a single star with a planetary system in the constellation of Ara. Its name is a Bayer designation that is Latinized from μ Arae, and abbreviated Mu Ara or μ Ara. This star is officially named Cervantes, pronounced /sɜːrˈvæntiːz/ or sur-VAN-teez, and is often designated HD 160691. With an apparent visual magnitude of 5.15, it is faintly visible to the naked eye. Based on parallax measurements it is located approximately 51 light-years (16 pc) away from the Sun. It is drifting closer with a radial velocity of −10 km/s.

Mu Arae is similar to the Sun, but is older, 10% more massive, and slightly evolved. It has four known extrasolar planets designated Mu Arae b, c, d and e; later named Quijote, Dulcinea, Rocinante and Sancho, respectively. Three of them have masses comparable with that of Jupiter. Mu Arae c, the innermost, was the first hot Neptune or super-Earth discovered.

== Nomenclature ==
μ Arae (Latinised to Mu Arae) is the star's Bayer designation. HD 160691 is the entry in the Henry Draper Catalogue.

The established convention for extrasolar planets is that the planets receive designations consisting of the star's name followed by lower-case Roman letters starting from "b", in order of discovery. This system was used by a team led by Krzysztof Goździewski. On the other hand, a team led by Francesco Pepe proposed a modification of the designation system, where the planets are designated in order of characterization. Since the parameters of the outermost planet were poorly constrained before the introduction of the 4-planet model of the system, this results in a different order of designations for the planets in the Mu Arae system. Both systems agree on the designation of the 640-day planet as "b". The old system designates the 9-day planet as "d", the 310-day planet as "e" and the outer planet as "c". Since the International Astronomical Union has not defined an official system for designations of extrasolar planets, the issue of which convention is 'correct' remains open, however most subsequent scientific publications about this system appear to have adopted the Pepe et al. system, as has the system's entry in the Extrasolar Planets Encyclopaedia.

In July 2014 the International Astronomical Union launched NameExoWorlds, a process for giving proper names to certain exoplanets and their host stars. The process involved public nomination and voting for the new names. In December 2015, the IAU announced the winning names were Cervantes for this star and Quijote, Dulcinea, Rocinante and Sancho, for its planets (b, c, d, and e, respectively; the IAU used the Pepe et al system).

The winning names were those submitted by the Planetario de Pamplona, Spain. Miguel de Cervantes Saavedra (1547–1616) was a famous Spanish writer and author of El Ingenioso Hidalgo Don Quixote de la Mancha. The planets are named after characters of that novel: Quijote was the lead character; Dulcinea his love interest; Rocinante his horse, and Sancho his squire.

In 2016, the IAU organized a Working Group on Star Names (WGSN) to catalog and standardize proper names for stars. In its first bulletin of July 2016, the WGSN explicitly recognized the names of exoplanets and their host stars approved by the Executive Committee Working Group Public Naming of Planets and Planetary Satellites, including the names of stars adopted during the 2015 NameExoWorlds campaign. This star is now so entered in the IAU Catalog of Star Names.

== Stellar characteristics ==
According to measurements made by the Gaia astrometric satellite, Mu Arae exhibits a parallax of 64.0853 milliarcseconds as the Earth moves around the Sun. When combined with the known distance from the Earth to the Sun, this means the star is located at a distance of 50.89 light-years (15.60 parsecs). (Note: The formula for converting parallax to distance is $\scriptstyle\mathrm{Distance\ in\ parsecs}=\frac{1}{\mathrm{parallax\ in\ arcseconds}}$) Seen from Earth it has an apparent magnitude of +5.15 and is thus visible to the naked eye.

Asteroseismic analysis of the star reveals it is approximately 10% more massive than the Sun and significantly older, at around 6.34 billion years. The radius of the star is 28% greater than that of the Sun and it is 90% more luminous. The star contains twice the abundance of iron relative to hydrogen of the Sun and is therefore described as metal-rich. Mu Arae is also more enriched than the Sun in the element helium.

Mu Arae has a listed spectral type of G3IV–V. The G3 part means the star is similar to the Sun (a G2V star). The star may be entering the subgiant stage of its evolution as it starts to run out of hydrogen in its core. This is reflected in its borderline luminosity class, between IV (the subgiants) and V (main sequence dwarf stars like the Sun). This star has a low chromospheric activity level and a low, non-variable X-ray luminosity.

== Planetary system ==
Emulation in Celestia of the exoplanets of Cervantes based in the Sudarsky's gas giant classification: Dulcinea, Rocinante, Quijote y Sancho.

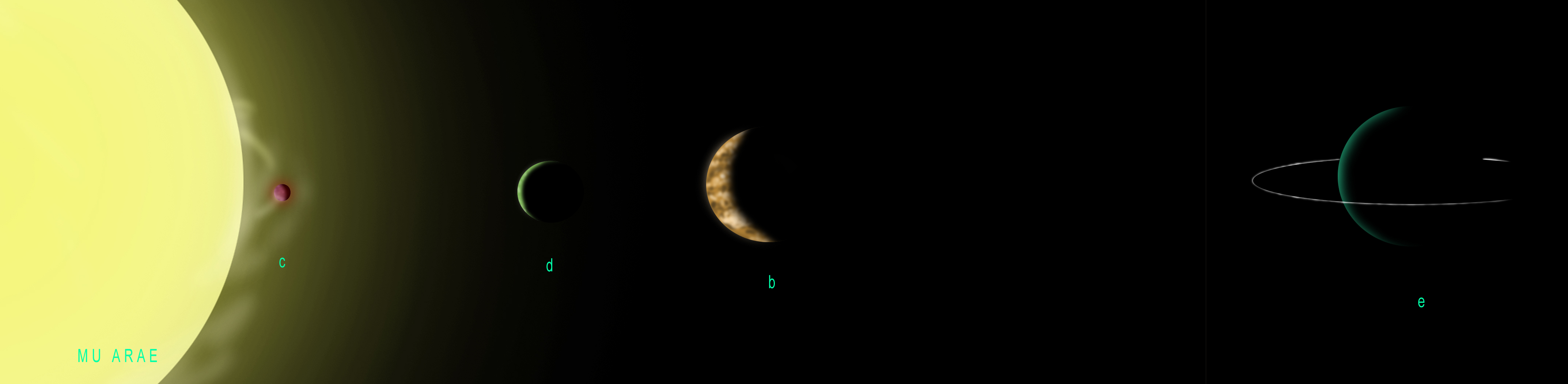
The Mu Arae star with distance relationships for its four planets

The orbits of the outer three planets in the Mu Arae system compared with those in the Solar System. Central star is not to scale. At the scale of this picture, the innermost planet would be located at the edge of the disc representing the central star.

=== Discovery ===
In 2001, an extrasolar planet was announced by the Anglo-Australian Planet Search team, together with the planet orbiting Epsilon Reticuli. The planet, designated Mu Arae b, was thought to be in a highly eccentric orbit of around 743 days. The discovery was made by analysing variations in the star's radial velocity (measured by observing the Doppler shift of the star's spectral lines) as a result of being pulled around by the planet's gravity. Further observations revealed the presence of a second object in the system (now designated as Mu Arae e), which was published in 2004. At the time, the parameters of this planet were poorly constrained and it was thought to be in an orbit of around 8.2 years with a high eccentricity. Later in 2004, a small inner planet designated Mu Arae c was announced with a mass comparable with that of Uranus in a 9-day orbit. This was the first of the class of planets known as "hot Neptunes" to be discovered. The discovery was made by making high-precision radial velocity measurements with the High Accuracy Radial Velocity Planet Searcher (HARPS) spectrograph.

In 2006, two teams, one led by Krzysztof Goździewski and the other by Francesco Pepe independently announced four-planet models for the radial velocity measurements of the star, with a new planet (Mu Arae d) in a near-circular orbit lasting approximately 311 days. The new model gives revised parameters for the previously known planets, with lower eccentricity orbits than in the previous model and including a more robust characterization of the orbit of Mu Arae e. The discovery of the fourth planet made Mu Arae the second known four-planet extrasolar system, after 55 Cancri.

=== System architecture and habitability ===
The Mu Arae system consists of an inner Uranus-mass planet in a tight 9-day orbit and three massive planets, probably gas giants, on wide, near-circular orbits, which contrasts with the high-eccentricity orbits typically observed for long-period extrasolar planets. The Uranus-mass planet may be a chthonian planet, the core of a gas giant which has had its outer layers stripped away by stellar radiation. Alternatively it may have formed in the inner regions of the Mu Arae system as a rocky "super-Earth".

The inner gas giants "d" and "b" are located close to the 2:1 orbital resonance which causes them to undergo strong interactions. The best-fit solution to the system is actually unstable: simulations suggest the system is destroyed after 78 million years, which is significantly shorter than the estimated age of the star system. More stable solutions, including ones in which the two planets are actually in the resonance (similar to the situation in the Gliese 876 system) can be found which give only a slightly worse fit to the data. A 2022 study finds a stable orbital fit to the system, and estimates a lower limit on the system inclination of about 20°.

Astrometric observations using the Hubble Space Telescope have not detected any of the known planets, but have set upper limits on the masses of the outer three planets: planet b is <4.3 M_{J}, planet d is <7.0 M_{J}, and planet e is <4.4 M_{J}. Searches for circumstellar discs show no evidence for a debris disc similar to the Kuiper belt around Mu Arae. If Mu Arae does have a Kuiper belt, it is too faint to be detected with current instruments.

The gas giant planet "b" is located in the liquid water habitable zone of Mu Arae. This would prevent an Earth-like planet from forming in the habitable zone, however large moons of the gas giant could potentially support liquid water. On the other hand, it is unclear whether moons sufficiently massive to retain an atmosphere and liquid water could actually form around a gas giant planet, due to a theorized scaling law between the mass of a planet and its satellite system. In addition, measurements of the star's ultraviolet flux suggest that any potentially habitable planets or moons may not receive enough ultraviolet to trigger the formation of biomolecules. Planet "d" would receive a similar amount of ultraviolet to the Earth and thus lies in the ultraviolet habitable zone. However, it would be too hot for any moons to support surface liquid water.

The Mu Arae planetary system
Companion (in order from star)	Mass	Semimajor axis (AU)	Orbital period (days)	Eccentricity	Inclination (°)	Radius
c (Dulcinea)	≥0.032±0.002 M_{J}	0.092319±0.000005	9.638±0.001	0.090±0.042	—	—
d (Rocinante)	≥0.448±0.011 M_{J}	0.9347±0.0015	308.36±0.29	0.055±0.014	—	—
b (Quijote)	≥1.65±0.009 M_{J}	1.522±0.001	644.92±0.29	0.041±0.009	—	—
e (Sancho)	≥1.932±0.022 M_{J}	5.204±0.021	4,019±24	0.049±0.011	—	—

== See also ==
- 55 Cancri
- Exoplanet
- Lists of exoplanets
- PSR B1257+12
