= Rocinante (disambiguation) =

Rocinante is the horse in the novel Don Quixote.

Rocinante may also refer to:

- Rocinante, a 1987 film directed by Eduardo Guedes starring John Hurt and Ian Dury
- Rosinante, a science fiction trilogy by Alexis A. Gilliland
- Rocinante, the modified camper truck in John Steinbeck's Travels with Charley
- Rocinante, a fictional spaceship in the songs of the Cygnus X-1 duology by Rush
- Rocinante, the main characters' spaceship in novel series The Expanse by James S. A. Corey, as well as the TV series The Expanse
- Rocinante, a car in Graham Greene's Monsignor Quixote
- Rocinante or mu Arae d, an exoplanet
- Donquixote Rocinante (Rosinante), the brother of One Piece antagonist Donquixote Doflamingo
- Rozinante or Roz, the name Dervla Murphy gave to her bicycle in Full Tilt: Ireland to India with a Bicycle
