= 55 Cancri Ac =

Extrasolar planet in the constellation Cancer

55 Cancri Ac / Brahe
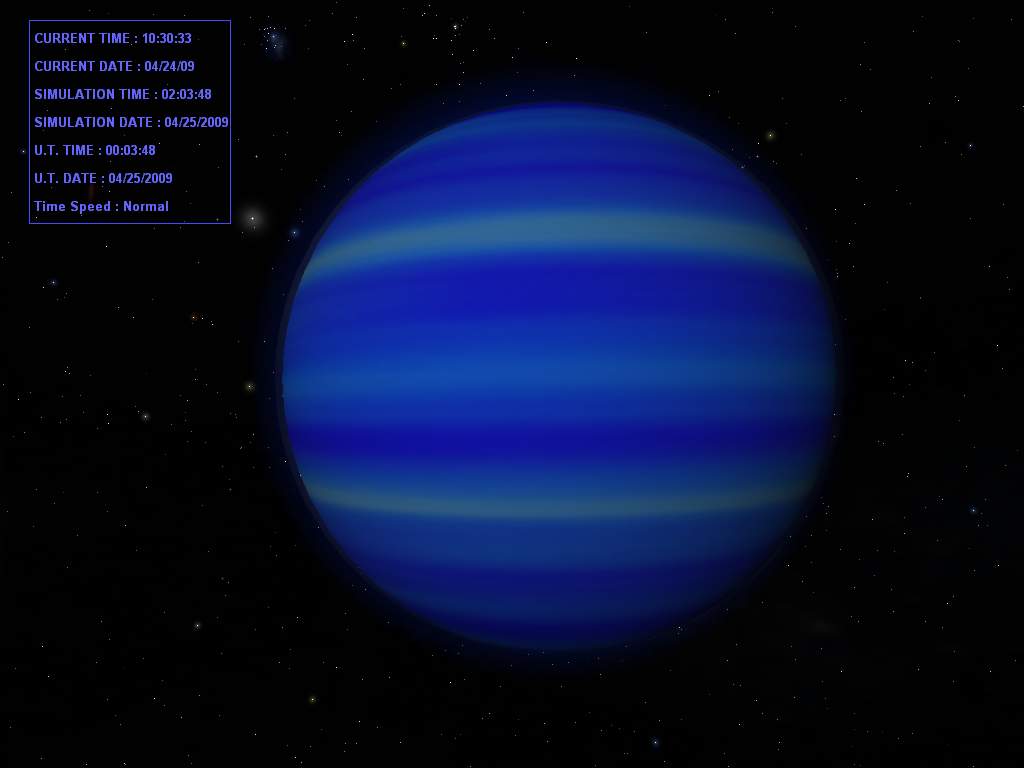
- The planet 55 Cnc Ac (min mass ~0.17 MJ) in MPL3D

Discovery
- Discovered by: Marcy et al.
- Discovery site: California, USA
- Discovery date: June 13, 2002
- Detection method: Radial velocity

Orbital characteristics
- Semi-major axis: 0.245403 ± 0.000033 AU (36,711,800 ± 4,900 km)
- Eccentricity: 0.03±0.10
- Orbital period (sidereal): 44.3989+0.0042 −0.0043 days
- Time of periastron: 2,455,491.23±0.34
- Argument of periastron: 0.54±0.24 radians
- Semi-amplitude: 10.17±0.22 km/s
- Star: 55 Cancri A

Physical characteristics
- Mass: ≥0.1588±0.0077 M_{J}

Radial velocity changes over time of 55 Cancri caused by the orbit of 55 Cancri Ac.

55 Cancri Ac (abbreviated 55 Cnc Ac), formally named Brahe (pronounced /ˈbrɑːhiː/ or /ˈbrɑː/), is an extrasolar planet in an eccentric orbit around the Sun-like star 55 Cancri A, making one revolution every 44.34 days. It is the third known planet in order of distance from its star. 55 Cancri Ac was discovered on June 13, 2002, and has a mass roughly half of Saturn.

In July 2014 the International Astronomical Union launched NameExoWorlds, a process for giving proper names to certain exoplanets and their host stars. The process involved public nomination and voting for the new names. In December 2015, the IAU announced the winning name was Brahe for this planet. The winning name was submitted by the Royal Netherlands Association for Meteorology and Astronomy of the Netherlands. It honors the astronomer Tycho Brahe.

== Discovery ==
Like the majority of known extrasolar planets, 55 Cancri Ac was detected by observing changes in its star's radial velocity. This was achieved by making sensitive measurements of the Doppler shift of the star's spectrum. At the time of discovery, 55 Cancri A was already known to possess one planet (55 Cancri Ab); however, there was still a drift in the radial velocity measurements which was unaccounted for.

In 2002, further measurements revealed the presence of a long-period planet in an orbit at around 5 AU from the star. Even when both of the two planets were accounted for, there was still a periodicity at around 43 days. However, this period is close to the rotation period of 55 Cancri A, which led to the possibility that the 43-day period was caused by stellar rotation rather than a planet. Both the 43-day planet (designated 55 Cancri Ac) and the 5 AU planet (designated 55 Cancri Ad) were announced in the same paper, labeled in order of increasing distance from the star.

Further measurements which led to the discovery of the inner planet 55 Cancri Ae in 2004 lent support to the planet hypothesis. Photometric measurements of the star over 11 years show no activity with the same period as 55 Cancri Ac's radial velocity variations, and furthermore the period is stable over long timescales, which is inconsistent with the hypothesis of stellar activity causing the radial velocity variations. The amplitude of the radial velocity signal is inconsistent with stellar variations on stars with 55 Cancri A's low level of chromospheric activity.

== Orbit and mass ==
In the 5-planet solution for the 55 Cancri A system, the orbit of 55 Cancri Ac is mildly eccentric: at apoastron the planet is about 19% further from the star than it is at periastron. It is located closer to 55 Cancri A than Mercury is to the Sun, though it has a longer orbital period than the hot Jupiters. The planet is located close to a 3:1 resonance with the inner planet 55 Cancri Ab; however, simulations indicate that the two planets are not actually in this resonance.

A limitation of the radial velocity method used to discover the planet is that only a lower limit on the mass can be obtained. Further astrometric observations with the Hubble Space Telescope on the outer planet 55 Cancri Ad suggest that planet is inclined at 53° to the plane of the sky; but innermost Ab and Ae are inclined at 85°. Planet Ac's inclination is unknown.

== Characteristics ==
Since the planet was detected indirectly through observations of its star, properties such as its radius, composition, and temperature are unknown. With a mass similar to that of Saturn, 55 Cancri Ac is likely to be a gas giant without a solid surface.

== See also ==
- Appearance of extrasolar planets
- Cancer (Chinese astronomy)
- Lists of exoplanets
- Mu Arae c, At constellation Ara
- Planetary system
