= 55 Cancri Af =

Extrasolar planet in the constellation Cancer

55 Cancri Af / Harriot
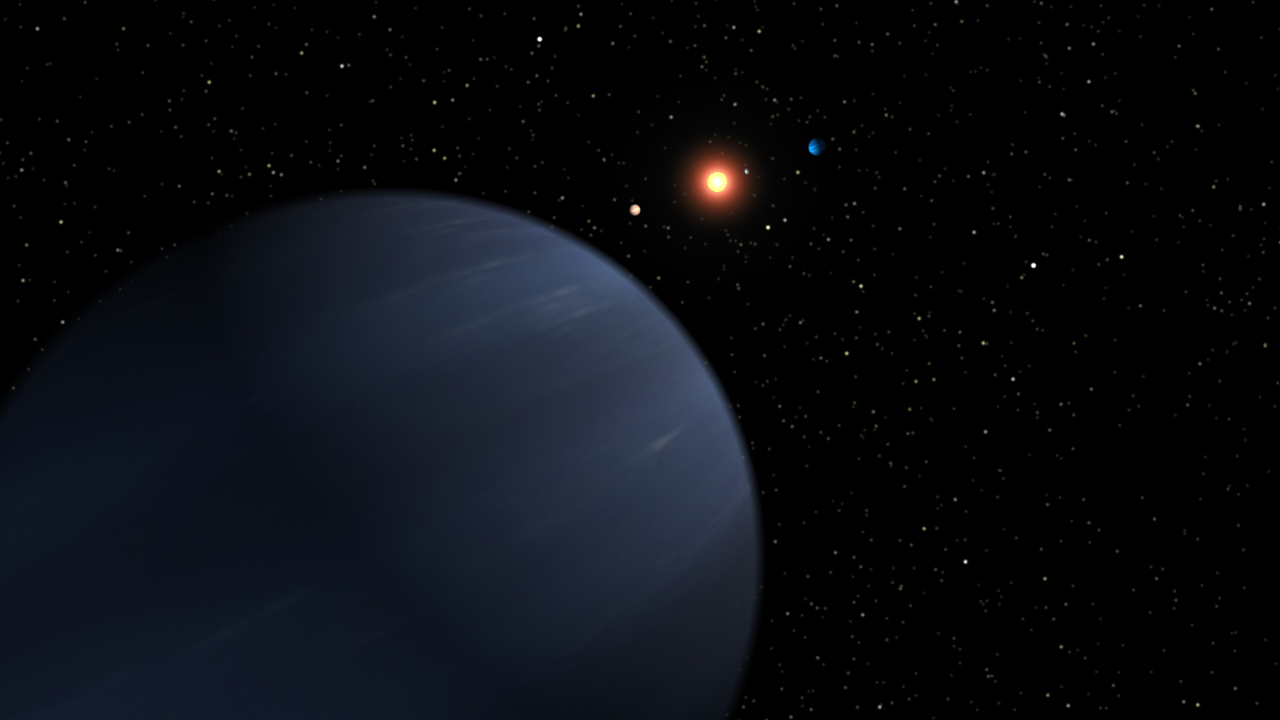
- An artist's impression of 55 Cancri Af. The three bright dots near its star are the three innermost planets.

Discovery
- Discovered by: announced by J. Wisdom published by D. Fischer
- Discovery site: United States
- Discovery date: 11 April 2005 (announced); 6 November 2007 (published)
- Detection method: Doppler spectroscopy

Orbital characteristics
- Semi-major axis: 0.802 ± 0.014 AU (120.0 ± 2.1 million km)
- Eccentricity: 0.063+0.048 −0.043
- Orbital period (sidereal): 260.58±0.15 days
- Time of periastron: 2,455,236.4±2.6
- Argument of periastron: 1.75+0.79 −0.44 radians
- Semi-amplitude: 4.83±0.22 km/s (host star)
- Star: 55 Cancri A

Physical characteristics
- Mass: ≥48.5±2.8 M_{🜨}

55 Cancri Af (abbreviated 55 Cnc Af), also designated Rho^{1} Cancri f and formally named Harriot /ˈhæriət/, is an exoplanet approximately 41 light-years away from Earth in the constellation of Cancer (the Crab). 55 Cancri Af is the fourth-known planet (in order of distance) from the star 55 Cancri A and the first planet to have been given the designation of "f".

== Name ==
In July 2014 the International Astronomical Union launched NameExoWorlds, a process for giving proper names to certain exoplanets and their host stars. The process involved public nomination and voting for the new names. In December 2015, the IAU announced the winning name was Harriot for this planet. The winning name was submitted by the Royal Netherlands Association for Meteorology and Astronomy of the Netherlands. It honors the astronomer Thomas Harriot.

== Discovery ==
Radial velocity changes over time of 55 Cancri caused by the orbit of 55 Cancri f

The initial presentation of this planet occurred at a meeting of the American Astronomical Society in April 2005; however, it was another two-and-a-half years before the planet was to be published in a peer-reviewed journal. It is the first known planet outside the Solar System to spend its entire orbit within what astronomers call the "habitable zone". Furthermore, its discovery made 55 Cancri A the first star other than the Sun known to have at least five planets.

== Orbit and mass ==
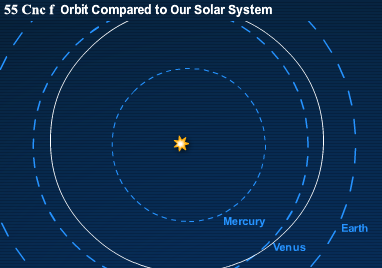
55 Cnc Af's orbit compared to the orbit of Venus (0.72 AU)

55 Cancri Af is located about 0.781 AU away from the star and takes 262 days to complete a full orbit. A limitation of the radial velocity method used to detect 55 Cancri Af is that only a minimum mass can be obtained, in this case around 0.144 times that of Jupiter, or half the mass of Saturn. A Keplerian fit to the radial velocity data of 55 Cancri A indicates that the orbit is consistent with being circular; however, changing the value in a range between 0 and 0.4 does not significantly alter the chi-squared statistic of the fit, thus a representative eccentricity of 0.2±0.2 was assumed. In a Newtonian model which takes interactions between the planets into account, the eccentricity comes out as 0.0002, almost perfectly circular.

Astrometric observations made with the Hubble Space Telescope suggest that the outer planet 55 Cancri Ad is inclined at 53° with respect to the plane of the sky. The inner planets b and e are inclined at 85°. The inclination of f is unknown.

== Characteristics ==
Since the planet was detected indirectly through observations of its star, properties such as its radius, composition and temperature are unknown. With a mass half that of Saturn, 55 Cancri Af is likely to be a gas giant with no solid surface. It orbits in the so-called "habitable zone," which means that liquid water could exist on the surface of a possible moon.

It is also possible that 55 Cancri Af is a "temperate ice giant" or hycean planet due to its orbit and possible hydrogen-rich composition.

It is not known if the composition and appearance is more like that of Saturn or Neptune.

== See also ==
- Appearance of extrasolar planets
- Cancer in Chinese astronomy
- Lists of exoplanets
- Planetary system
