= Mu Arae e =

Extrasolar planet in the constellation Ara

Mu Arae e / Sancho
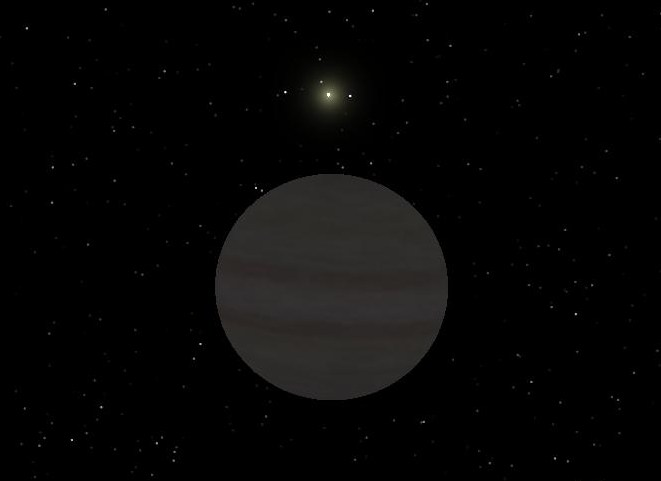
- Mu Arae e rendered by Celestia

Discovery
- Discovered by: Butler, Marcy
- Discovery site: California, USA
- Discovery date: June 13, 2002
- Detection method: Radial velocity

Orbital characteristics
- Apastron: 5.750 AU (860,200,000 km)
- Periastron: 4.719 AU (706,000,000 km)
- Semi-major axis: 5.235 AU (783,100,000 km)
- Eccentricity: 0.0985 ± 0.0627
- Orbital period (sidereal): 4205.8 ± 758.9 d 11.51 y
- Time of periastron: 2,450,541 ± 96
- Argument of periastron: 57.6 ± 43.7
- Semi-amplitude: 18.1 ± 1.1
- Star: Mu Arae

Mu Arae e, also known as HD 160691 e, later named Sancho /ˈsæntʃoʊ/, is one of the four extrasolar planets orbiting the star Mu Arae of the constellation Ara.

== Naming ==
In July 2014 the International Astronomical Union launched NameExoWorlds, a process for giving proper names to certain exoplanets and their host stars. The process involved public nomination and voting for the new names. In December 2015, the IAU announced the winning name was Sancho for this planet. The winning name was submitted by the Planetario de Pamplona, Spain. Sancho was the squire of the lead character of the novel Don Quixote.

== Orbit ==
The planet's discovery was announced on June 13, 2002. Mu Arae e is a gas giant at least 1.8 times as massive as Jupiter. The planet orbits at Jupiter-like distance at 5.235 AU.
