= 55 Cancri Ab =

Extrasolar planet in the constellation Cancer

55 Cancri Ab / Galileo
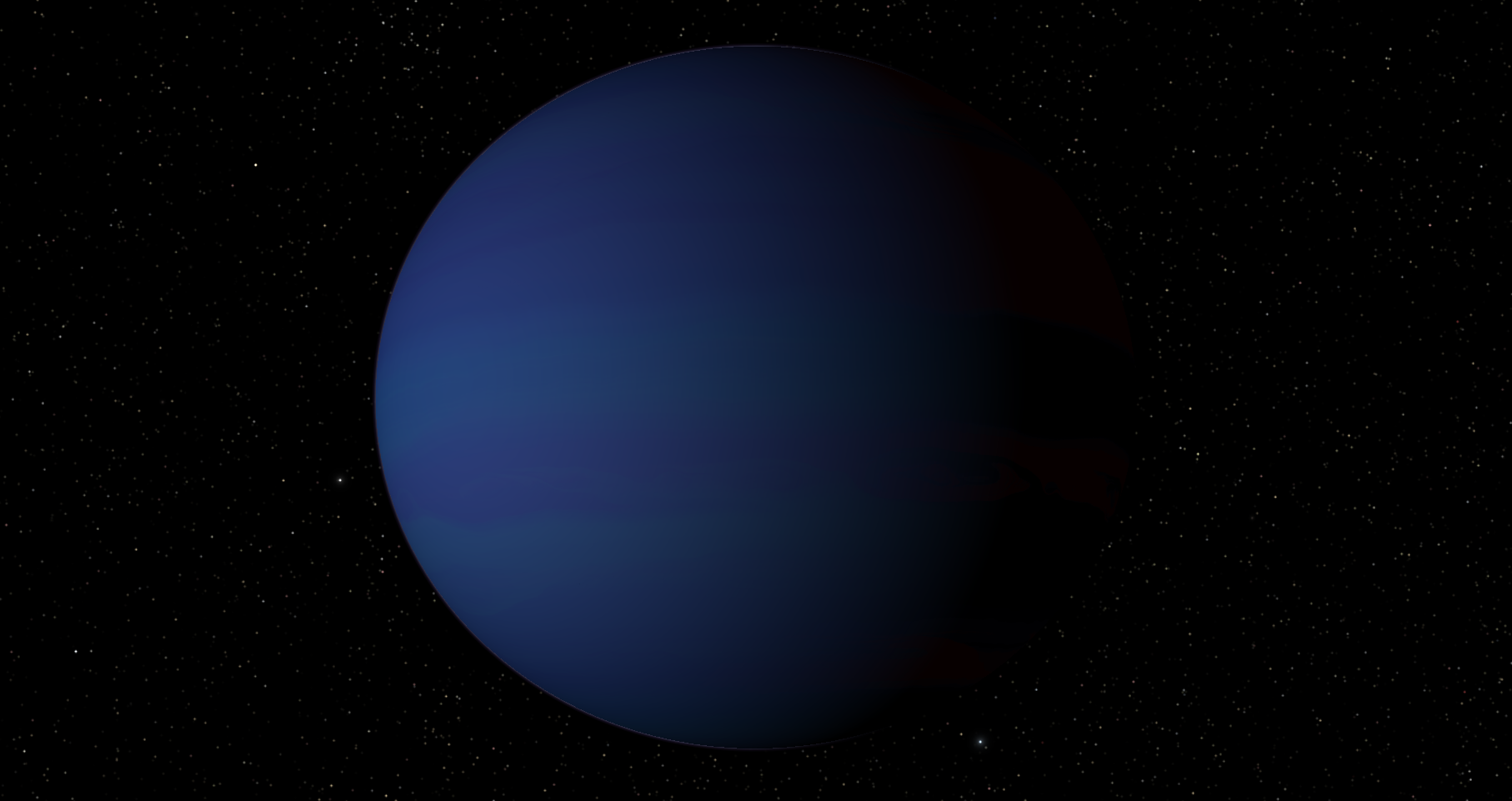
- Artist's impression of 55 Cancri Ab

Discovery
- Discovered by: Butler, Marcy
- Discovery site: California, U.S.
- Discovery date: April 12, 1996
- Detection method: Radial velocity

Orbital characteristics
- Semi-major axis: 0.117182280 ± 0.000000063 AU (17,530,219.6 ± 9.4 km)
- Eccentricity: 0.0013±0.0054
- Orbital period (sidereal): 14.651535(6) days
- Inclination: 85? °
- Time of periastron: 2,455,495.595+0.012 −0.015
- Argument of periastron: 0.41+0.97 −1.0 rad
- Semi-amplitude: 71.5±0.2 m/s (host star)
- Star: 55 Cancri A

Physical characteristics
- Mass: ≥0.802±0.020 M_{J}

55 Cancri Ab (abbreviated 55 Cnc Ab), formally named Galileo, is an exoplanet orbiting the Sun-like star 55 Cancri A every 14.65 days. It is the second planet in order of distance from its star, and is an example of a hot Jupiter, or possibly rather "warm Jupiter".

In July 2014 the International Astronomical Union launched NameExoWorlds, a process for giving proper names to certain exoplanets and their host stars. The process involved public nomination and voting for the new names. In December 2015, the IAU announced the winning name was Galileo for this planet. The winning name was submitted by the Royal Netherlands Association for Meteorology and Astronomy of the Netherlands. It honors early-17th-century astronomer and physicist Galileo Galilei.

== Discovery ==
The radial velocity trend of 55 Cancri caused by the presence of 55 Cancri Ab

55 Cancri Ab was discovered in 1996 by Geoffrey Marcy and R. Paul Butler. It was the fourth known extrasolar planet, excluding pulsar planets. It was discovered by detecting variations in its star's radial velocity caused by the planet's gravity. By making sensitive measurements of the Doppler shift of the spectrum of 55 Cancri A, a 15-day periodicity was detected. The planet was announced in 1996, together with the planet of Tau Boötis and the innermost planet of Upsilon Andromedae.

Even when this inner planet, with a mass at least 78% times that of Jupiter was accounted for, the star still showed a drift in its radial velocity. This eventually led to the discovery of the outer planet 55 Cancri Ad in 2002.

== Orbit and mass ==
55 Cancri Ab is in a short-period orbit, at about 0.118 AU (17.7 million km) from its host star, though not so extreme as that of the previously detected hot Jupiter 51 Pegasi b. The orbital period indicates that the planet is located close to a 1:3 mean motion resonance with 55 Cancri Ac; however, investigations of the planetary parameters in a Newtonian simulation indicate that while the orbital periods are close to this ratio, the planets are not actually in the resonance.

In 2012, Ab's upper atmosphere was observed transiting the star; so its inclination is about 85 degrees, coplanar with 55 Cancri Ae. This helped to constrain the mass of the planet but the inclination was too low to constrain its radius.

The mass is at least 0.80 that of Jupiter.

== Characteristics ==
55 Cancri Ab is a gas giant with no solid surface. The atmospheric transit has demonstrated hydrogen in the upper atmosphere.

That transit is so tangential that properties such as its radius, density and temperature are unknown. Assuming a composition similar to that of Jupiter and that its environment is close to chemical equilibrium, 55 Cancri Ab's upper atmosphere is predicted to be cloudless with a spectrum dominated by alkali metal absorption.

The atmosphere's transit indicates that it is slowly evaporating under its star's heat. The evaporation is slower than that for previously studied (hotter) hot Jupiters.

The planet is unlikely to have large moons, since tidal forces would either eject them from orbit or destroy them on short timescales relative to the age of the system.

== See also ==
- Exoplanet
- Cancer in Chinese astronomy
- List of exoplanets discovered before 2000
- GJ 1132 b – rocky exoplanet with a confirmed atmosphere
- Mu Arae c – in constellation Ara
- Planetary system
