= 55 Cancri =

Binary star with at least seven exoplanets 41 light-years away

- Location of 55 Cancri (circled in red)

Observation data Epoch J2000.0 Equinox ICRS
- Constellation: Cancer
- Pronunciation: /ˈkæŋkraɪ/ or /ˈkæŋkriː/
- 55 Cancri A
- Right ascension: 08^{h} 52^{m} 35.8111^{s}
- Declination: +28° 19′ 50.955″
- Apparent magnitude (V): 5.95
- 55 Cancri B
- Right ascension: 08^{h} 52^{m} 40.8627^{s}
- Declination: +28° 19′ 58.821″
- Apparent magnitude (V): 13.15

Characteristics

55 Cancri A
- Evolutionary stage: Main sequence
- Spectral type: K0IV–V
- U−B color index: 0.63
- B−V color index: 0.87

55 Cancri B
- Evolutionary stage: Main sequence (red dwarf)
- Spectral type: M4.5V
- B−V color index: 1.7

Astrometry

55 Cancri A
Radial velocity (R_{v})	27.51 km/s
Proper motion (μ)	RA: −485.681 mas/yr Dec.: −233.517 mas/yr
Parallax (π)	79.4482±0.0429 mas
Distance	41.05 ± 0.02 ly (12.587 ± 0.007 pc)
Absolute magnitude (M_{V})	+5.50

55 Cancri B
Proper motion (μ)	RA: −481.176 mas/yr Dec.: −244.544 mas/yr
Parallax (π)	79.6560±0.0475 mas
Distance	40.95 ± 0.02 ly (12.554 ± 0.007 pc)
Absolute magnitude (M_{V})	+12.58±0.088

Orbit
Semi-major axis (a)	1,260+830 −430 AU
Eccentricity (e)	0.55+0.32 −0.37
Inclination (i)	67.7+7.0 −24.0°
Longitude of the node (Ω)	177+153 −42°
Argument of periastron (ω) (secondary)	183+138 −134°

Details

55 Cancri A
Mass	0.905±0.015 M_{☉}
Radius	0.980±0.015 R_{☉}
Luminosity	0.617±0.009 L_{☉}
Surface gravity (log g)	4.41±0.02 cgs
Temperature	5,172±18 K
Metallicity [Fe/H]	+0.32±0.02 dex
Rotation	38.8±0.05 days
Rotational velocity (v sin i)	2.30±0.64 km/s
Age	8.6±1 Gyr

55 Cancri B
Mass	0.264±0.007 M_{☉}
Radius	0.268±0.009 R_{☉}
Luminosity	0.00788±0.00013 L_{☉}
Temperature	3,320±51 K
Metallicity [Fe/H]	0.15±0.16 dex
Rotation	92±5 days
Rotational velocity (v sin i)	2.36 km/s

Other designations
- Copernicus, Rho^{1} Cancri, 55 Cnc, BD+28°1660, GJ 324, HD 75732, HIP 43587, HR 3522, SAO 80585

Database references
SIMBAD	data
- 55 Cnc B
Exoplanet Archive	data
ARICNS	data

55 Cancri is a binary star system located 41 light-years away from the Sun in the zodiac constellation of Cancer. It has the Bayer designation Rho^{1} Cancri (ρ^{1} Cancri); 55 Cancri is the Flamsteed designation (abbreviated 55 Cnc). The system consists of a K-type star (designated 55 Cancri A, also named Copernicus /koʊˈpɜːrnɪkəs/) and a smaller red dwarf (55 Cancri B).

As of 2025, five extrasolar planets, designated 55 Cancri Ab, Ac, Ae, Af, and Ad, named Galileo, Brahe, Janssen, Harriot and Lipperhey, respectively, and one planet candidate, 55 Cancri Ag, are known to orbit 55 Cancri A; alongside two extrasolar planets, designated Bb and Bc, which are known to orbit 55 Cancri B.

== Nomenclature ==
55 Cancri is the system's Flamsteed designation. It also bears the Bayer designation ρ^{1} Cancri (Latinised to Rho^{1} Cancri) and the Bright Star Catalogue designation HR 3522. The two components are designated A and B, though component A is sometimes referred to simply as 55 Cancri. The first planet discovered orbiting 55 Cancri A was designated HR 3522b by its discoverers, though it is more commonly referred to as 55 Cancri Ab. Under the rules for naming objects in binary star systems it should be named 55 Cancri Ab and this more formal form is occasionally used to avoid confusion with the secondary star 55 Cancri B. The other planets discovered were designated 55 Cancri Ac, Ad, Ae and Af, in order of their discovery.

In July 2014 the International Astronomical Union launched NameExoWorlds, a process for giving proper names to certain exoplanets and their host stars. The process involved public nomination and voting for the new names. In December 2015, the IAU announced the winning names were Copernicus for 55 Cancri A and Galileo, Brahe, Lipperhey, Janssen and Harriot for its planets (Ab, Ac, Ad, Ae and Af, respectively).

The winning names were those submitted by the Royal Netherlands Association for Meteorology and Astronomy of the Netherlands. They honor the astronomers Nicolaus Copernicus, Galileo Galilei, Tycho Brahe and Thomas Harriot and the spectacle makers and telescope pioneers Hans Lipperhey and Zacharias Janssen. (The IAU originally announced the winning name was Lippershey for 55 Cancri Ad. In January 2016, in recognition that his actual name was Lipperhey (with Lippershey an error introduced in the 19th century), the exoplanet name was corrected to Lipperhey by the IAU and that name was submitted to the official sites that keep track of astronomical information).

In 2016, the IAU organized a Working Group on Star Names (WGSN) to catalog and standardize proper names for stars. In its first bulletin of July 2016, the WGSN explicitly recognized the names of exoplanets and their host stars approved by the Executive Committee Working Group Public Naming of Planets and Planetary Satellites, including the names of stars adopted during the 2015 NameExoWorlds campaign. This star is now so entered in the IAU Catalog of Star Names.

== Stellar system ==
The 55 Cancri system is located fairly close to the Solar System: the Gaia astrometry satellite measured the parallax of 55 Cancri A as 79.45 milliarcseconds, corresponding to a distance of 12.6 parsecs (41 light-years). 55 Cancri A has an apparent magnitude of 5.95, making it just visible to the naked eye under very dark skies. The red dwarf 55 Cancri B is of the 13th magnitude and only visible through a telescope. The two components are separated by 85″, an estimated separation of 1,065 AU (6.15 light-days). Despite their wide separation, the two stars appear to be gravitationally bound, as they share a common proper motion.

=== 55 Cancri A ===
The primary star, 55 Cancri A, has a spectral type of K0IV-V, indicating a main-sequence or subgiant star. It is smaller in radius and slightly less massive than the Sun, and so is cooler and less luminous. The star has only low emission from its chromosphere, and is not variable in the visible spectrum; but it is variable in X-rays. It is more enriched than the Sun in elements heavier than helium, with 186% the solar abundance of iron; it is therefore classified as a rare "super metal-rich" (SMR) star. 55 Cancri A also has more carbon than the Sun, with a carbon-to-oxygen ratio of 0.78, compared to solar value of 0.55. This abundance of metal makes estimating the star's age and mass difficult, as evolutionary models are less well defined for such stars. 55 Cancri A is much older than the solar system, and its age has been estimated to values of 7.4–8.7 billion years or 10.2±2.5 billion years.

A hypothesis for the high metal content in SMR dwarf stars is that material enriched in heavy elements fell into the atmosphere from a protoplanetary disk. This would pollute the star's external layers, resulting in a higher than normal metallicity. The lack of a deep convection zone would mean that the outer layers would retain higher abundance ratios of these heavy elements.

Observations of 55 Cancri A in the submillimeter region of the spectrum have thus far failed to detect any associated dust. The upper limit on emissions within 100 AU of this star is about 850 mJy, at a wavelength of 850 μm. This limits the total mass of fine dust around the star to less than 0.01% of the Earth's mass. However, this does not exclude the presence of an asteroid belt or a Kuiper belt equivalent.

=== 55 Cancri B ===
The secondary, 55 Cancri B, is a red dwarf star much less massive and luminous than the Sun. It was first reported as a companion to 55 Cancri A by Adriaan van Maanen in 1918.

== Planetary systems ==
=== 55 Cancri A ===
The 55 Cancri A planetary system
Companion (in order from star)	Mass	Semimajor axis (AU)	Orbital period (days)	Eccentricity	Inclination (°)	Radius
e (Janssen)	7.74+0.37 −0.30 M_{🜨}	0.01596151(11)	0.73654625(15)	0.01+0.02 −0.01	83.9+0.6 −0.5	1.856+0.024 −0.025 R_{🜨}
b (Galileo)	≥0.802±0.020 M_{J}	0.117182280(63)	14.651535(6)	0.0013±0.0054	—	—
c (Brahe)	≥0.1588±0.0077 M_{J}	0.245403(33)	44.3989+0.0042 −0.0043	0.03±0.10	—	—
f (Harriot)	≥48.5±2.8 M_{🜨}	0.802±0.014	260.58±0.15	0.063+0.048 −0.043	—	—
g (unconfirmed)	≥0.9 M_{J}	—	3,827.1+9.3 −6.4	0.35±0.02	—	—
d (Lipperhey)	3.23+0.29 −0.30 M_{J}	5.58+0.24 −0.26	5,084±40	0.0153+0.0044 −0.0029	93.9+6.9 −6.7	—

Comparison of the orbits of the inner planets of 55 Cancri A (black) with the planets of the Solar System

The primary star 55 Cancri A was the first known to have four, and later five, planets. The innermost planet, Ae, transits 55 Cancri A as viewed from Earth. The next planet, Ab, is non-transiting but there is tentative evidence that it is surrounded by an extended atmosphere that does transit the star.

In 1997, the discovery of a 51 Pegasi-like planet orbiting 55 Cancri A was announced, together with the planet of Tau Boötis and the inner planet of Upsilon Andromedae. The planet was discovered by measuring the star's radial velocity, which showed a periodicity of around 14.7 days corresponding to a planet at least 78% of the mass of Jupiter. These radial velocity measurements still showed a drift unaccounted for by this planet, which could be explained by the gravitational influence of a more distant object.

In 1998 the discovery of a possible dust disk around 55 Cancri A was announced. Calculations gave the disk radius at least 40 AU, similar to the Kuiper belt in the Solar System, with an inclination of 25° with respect to the plane of the sky. However, the discovery could not be verified and was later deemed to be spurious, caused instead by background galaxies.

After making further radial velocity measurements, a planet orbiting at a distance of around 5 AU was announced in 2002. This planet received the designation 55 Cancri Ad. At the time of discovery, the planet was thought to be in an orbit of mild eccentricity (close to 0.1), but this value was increased by later measurements. Even after accounting for these two planets, a periodicity at 43 days remained, possibly due to a third planet. Measurements of the star suggested that this was close to the star's rotation period, which raised the possibility that the 43-day signal was caused by stellar activity. This possible planet received the designation 55 Cancri Ac.

55 Cancri Ae was announced in 2004. With 8.3 Earth masses, it is a large super-Earth which was originally thought to have an orbital period of 2.8 days, though it was later found that this was an alias of its true period of 0.74 of a day by observations of Ae transiting in 2011. This planet was the first known instance of a fourth extrasolar planet in one system, and was the shortest-period planet until the discovery of PSR J1719−1438 b. The measurements that led to the discovery of this planet also confirmed the existence of 55 Cancri Ac.

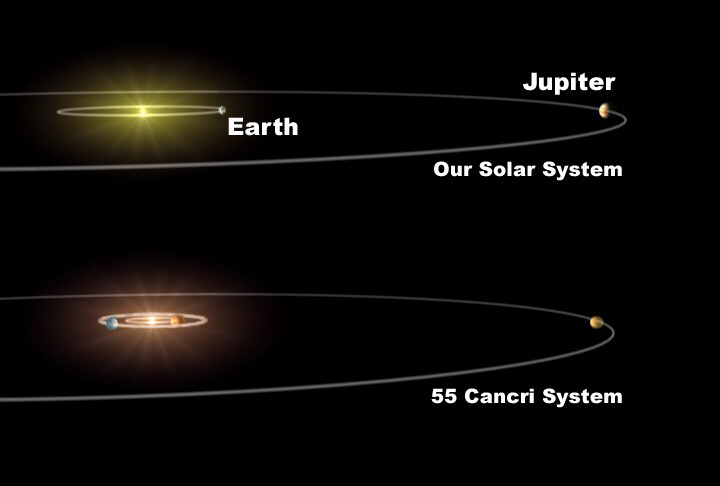
The Solar System with only Earth and Jupiter compared with the planetary system of 55 Cancri (Note: this depiction was made before planets Ae, Af, and the unconfirmed candidate Ag were discovered.)

In 2005, Jack Wisdom combined three data sets and drew two distinct conclusions: that the 2.8-day planet was an alias and that there was a Neptune-scale planet with a period near 261 days. Fischer et al. (2008) reported new observations that they said confirmed the existence of the 2.8-day planet, as first reported by McArthur et al. (2004), and a 260-day Neptune-sized planet, as first reported by Wisdom (2005). However, Dawson and Fabrycky (2010) concluded that the 2.8-day planet was indeed an alias, as suggested by Wisdom (2005), and that the correct period was 0.7365 of a day.

In 2007, Fisher et al. confirmed the existence of the 260-day planet proposed in 2005 by Wisdom. This planet, 55 Cancri Af, was the first occurrence of a fifth extrasolar planet in one system. With a similar mass to Ac, it has a 260-day orbit, towards the inner edge of 55 Cancri A's habitable zone.

Astrometric observations with the Hubble Space Telescope measured an inclination of 53° of the outer planet d, though this result relies on orbital parameters which have been substantially revised since this was published. The observed transits of e suggest an orbit normal inclined within 9° to the line-of-sight, and a possible detection of the transit of an extended atmosphere around 55 Cancri Ab would, if confirmed, imply that it too is in an orbit that is close to edge-on. Between them, no measurement of Ac's nor Af's inclinations have been made. It had been thought that with five planets, the system cannot deviate far from coplanar in order to maintain stability. An attempt to measure the spin-orbit misalignment of the innermost planet reported that it was in a nearly polar orbit, but this interpretation of the data has since been challenged by a subsequent study, with noted inconsistencies between the implied and measured stellar rotation.

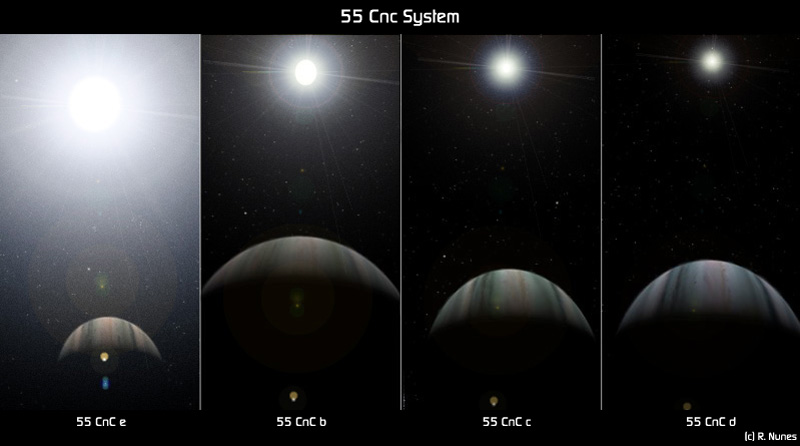
Artist's rendition of 55 Cnc's planets

The approximate ratios of periods of adjacent orbits are (proceeding outward): 1:20, 1:3, 1:6, 1:20. The nearly 1:3 ratio between 55 Cancri Ab and Ac is apparently a near resonance, rather than a genuine mean motion resonance.

A 2025 study found that a four-planet model with Ab, Ac, Ae and Af as planets, accounting for the stellar activity cycle, explains the observed radial velocities at least as well as a five-planet model with 55 Cancri Ad. Therefore, 55 Cancri Ad remains unconfirmed and other observations, such as by astrometry, are required to confirm it. Astrometric detection of the planet was finally done in 2026, yielding an inclination of 94° and a true mass of 3.2 M_{J}.

Another 2025 study proposed the existence of a possible sixth planet, Ag, based on a variation with a period of 3,827 days on the stellar radial velocity. Variations at a similar period have been historically attributed to the magnetic cycle of the star, but the nature of the signal and its amplitude suggest that it is due to an orbiting object, or at least that both a planet and a magnetic cycle coexist at a similar period. If the signal is fully planetary, the planet's minimum mass would be 0.9 M_{J}; otherwise the minimum mass would be a bit smaller. While the 3,827-day periodicity is favored by the best-fit model, alternative solutions such as a period of 1,900 days can not be ruled out. If 55 Cancri Ag is real, the two outer planets would be expected to experience mutual gravitational perturbations.

=== 55 Cancri B ===
In 2025, 55 Cancri B was also found to have exoplanets, using the Doppler spectroscopy technique. 55 Cancri Bb has at least 3.5 times Earth's mass and an orbital period of 6.8 days, having an circular orbit with a separation of 0.044 astronomical units (6,600,000 km). It receives an insolation 2.6 times that Earth receives from the Sun and has an equilibrium temperature estimated to be in the range of 330 to 370 K. 55 Cancri Bc has at least 5.3 times Earth's mass and an orbital period of 33.75 days. It also has a circular orbit, with a semi-major axis of 0.13 astronomical units (19,000,000 km), placing it in the outer edge of the habitable zone. It receives only around 30% of the insolation Earth receives and has an estimated equilibrium temperature in the range of 190 to 210 K.

The 55 Cancri B planetary system
Companion (in order from star)	Mass	Semimajor axis (AU)	Orbital period (days)	Eccentricity	Inclination (°)	Radius
b	≥3.5±0.8 M_{🜨}	0.0440±0.0012	6.7994+0.0013 −0.0014	0	—	—
c	≥5.3±1.4 M_{🜨}	0.130±0.003	33.747±0.035	0	—	—

=== Possible additional planets ===
There appears to be a huge gap of distance between 55 Cancri Ad and 55 Cancri Af where no planets are known to orbit. A 2008 paper found that as many as 3 additional planets of up to 50 times the mass of Earth could orbit at a distance of 0.9 to 3.8 AU from the star, and stable resonances of a hypothetical planet with the known planets were found to be 3f:2g, 2g:1d, and 3g:2d. A study released in 2019 showed that undiscovered terrestrial planets may be able to orbit safely in this region at 1 to 2 AU; this space includes the outer limits of 55 Cancri's habitable zone. In 2021, it was found that terrestrial planets with comparable water content to Earth may have indeed been able to form and survive between the planets Af and Ad. As for the space outside Ad's orbit, its stability zone begins beyond 10 AU, though there is a stability zone between 8.6 and 9 AU due to a 2:1 resonance.

There is also a large gap between the known planets of 55 Cancri B, leaving room for additional planets between their orbits.

=== Search for radio emissions ===
Since 55 Cancri Ae orbits less than 0.1 AU from its host star, some scientists hypothesized that it may cause stellar flaring synchronized to the orbital period of the exoplanet. A 2011 search for these magnetic star-planet interactions that would result in coronal radio emissions resulted in no detected signal. Furthermore, no magnetospheric radio emissions were detected from any exoplanet within the system.

== Communication ==
A METI message was sent to 55 Cancri. It was transmitted from Eurasia's largest radar—the 70 m (230 ft) Evpatoria Planetary Radar. The message was named Cosmic Call 2; it was sent on July 6, 2003, and it will arrive at 55 Cancri in May 2044.

== See also ==
- 58 Cancri, or Rho^{2} Cancri (ρ^{2} Cnc)
- Sudarsky's gas giant classification
- Cancer in Chinese astronomy
- Kepler-186
- Lists of exoplanets
- GJ 1132 b – rocky exoplanet
- Mu Arae c – exoplanet in constellation Ara
- Planetary system
- PSR B1257+12

Other systems with multiple planet-hosting stars:

- HD 20781 & HD 20782
- HD 133131
- TOI-2267
- WASP-94
- XO-2
- Struve 2398
