= Mu Arae b =

Extrasolar planet in the constellation Ara

Mu Arae b / Quijote
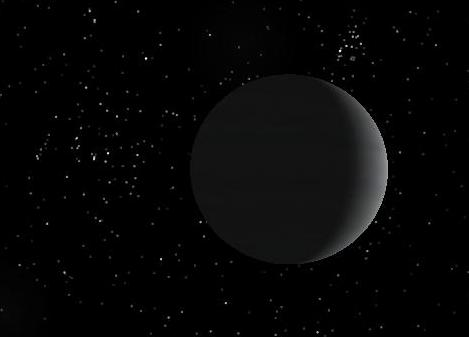
- Simulated image of Mu Arae b

Discovery
- Discovered by: Butler, Marcy
- Discovery site: California, US
- Discovery date: December 12, 2000
- Detection method: Doppler Spectroscopy

Orbital characteristics
- Apastron: 1.689 AU (252,700,000 km)
- Periastron: 1.304 AU (195,100,000 km)
- Semi-major axis: 1.497 AU (223,900,000 km)
- Eccentricity: 0.128
- Orbital period (sidereal): 643.25 ± 0.90 d 1.7611 y
- Time of periastron: 2452365.6 ± 12.6
- Argument of periastron: 22.0 ± 7.0
- Semi-amplitude: 37.78 ± 0.40
- Star: Mu Arae

Mu Arae b, often designated HD 160691 b and formally named Quijote /kiˈhoʊtiː/, is an exoplanet orbiting the star Mu Arae in the constellation Ara.

== Description ==
The planet has at least one and a half times the mass of Jupiter, and its orbital period is 643.25 days. The discovery of this planet was announced on December 12, 2002, and was originally thought to be on a highly eccentric orbit. The latest models of Mu Arae planetary system, which has four known planets, give a lower eccentricity orbit. Although the planet itself is likely to be a gas giant with no solid surface, the orbital distance of 1.497 astronomical units from its star puts it within the habitable zone of its planetary system. However, it may not receive enough ultraviolet light for abiogenesis to proceed. Furthermore, it is not clear that Earth-size moons can actually be formed in the environment around a gas giant planet.

== Name ==
In July 2014 the International Astronomical Union launched NameExoWorlds, a process for giving proper names to certain exoplanets and their host stars. The process involved public nomination and voting for the new names. In December 2015, the IAU announced the winning name was Quijote for this planet. The winning name was submitted by the Planetario de Pamplona, Spain. Quijote was the lead character of the novel Don Quixote. Although the character's name is more commonly spelled Quixote in English, Quijote is the current Spanish spelling.
