= Tau Boötis b =

Hot Jupiter orbiting Tau Boötis A

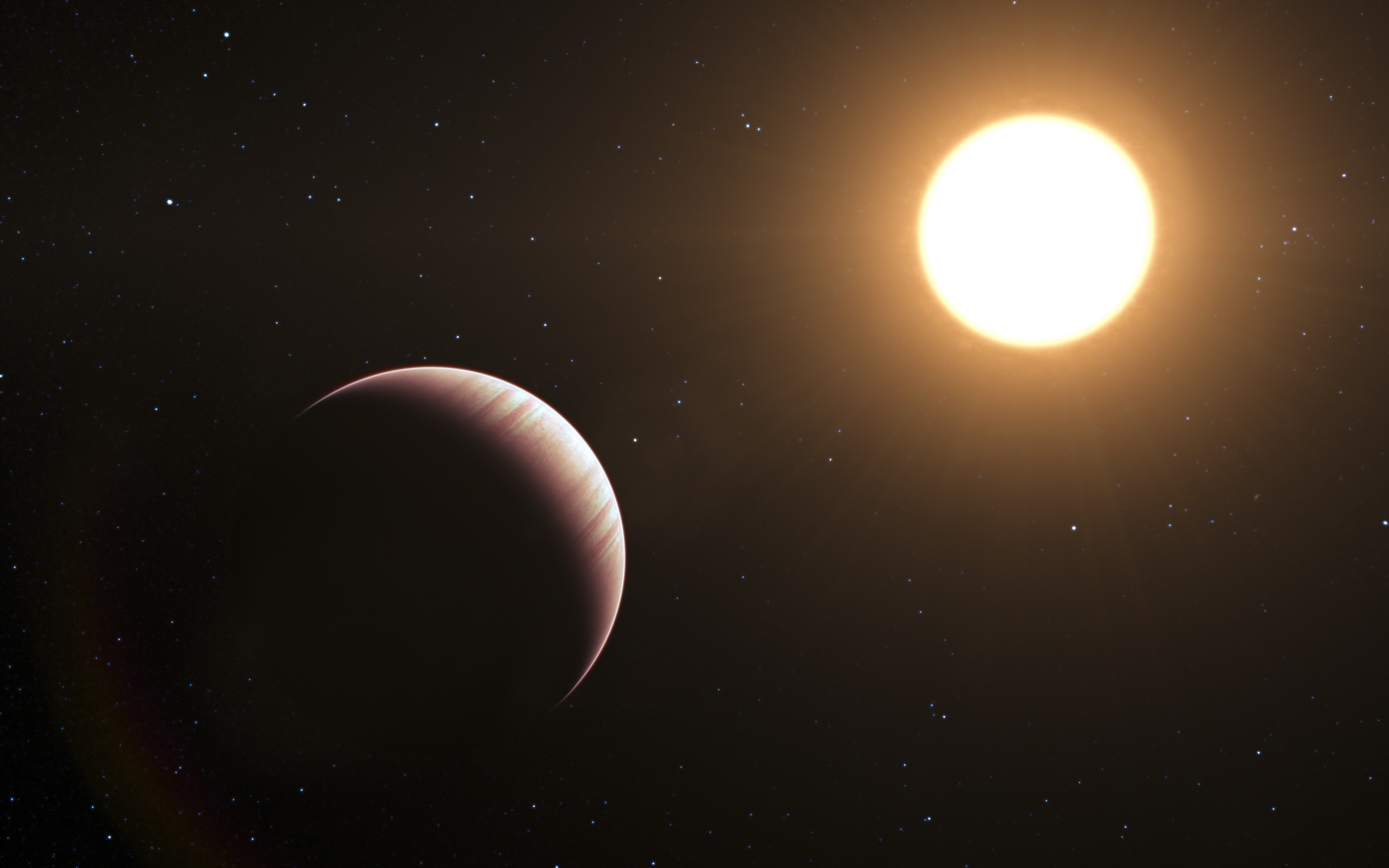
- Artist's impression of Tau Boötis b orbiting close to its parent star.

Discovery
- Discovered by: Butler et al.
- Discovery site: Lick Observatory
- Discovery date: 1996
- Detection method: Doppler spectroscopy

Orbital characteristics
- Semi-major axis: 0.04869+0.00039 −0.00040 AU
- Eccentricity: 0.0074+0.0059 −0.0048
- Orbital period (sidereal): 3.3124568±0.000033 days
- Inclination: 41.6°+1.0° −0.9°
- Time of periastron: MJD 56,401.8797±0.0036
- Argument of periastron: 171.4°+5.7° −6.9°
- Semi-amplitude: 106.21+1.76 −1.71 km/s
- Star: Tau Boötis A

Physical characteristics
- Mean radius: 1.2 R_{J} (assumed)
- Mass: 6.24+0.17 −0.18 M_{J}
- Temperature: 1,600 K (1,330 °C; 2,420 °F) (estimated)

Tau Boötis b, or more precisely Tau Boötis Ab, as well as Tepiamenit Ab is an extrasolar planet approximately 51 light-years away, around the primary star of the Tau Boötis system in the constellation of Boötes. It was one of the first exoplanets to be discovered. It is a hot Jupiter, with about six times the mass of Jupiter and completing an orbit around its star in just 3.3 days.

== Discovery ==
Discovered in 1996, the planet is one of the first extrasolar planets found. It was discovered orbiting the star Tau Boo (HR 5185) by Paul Butler and his team (San Francisco Planet Search Project) using the highly successful radial velocity method. Since the star is visually bright and the planet is massive, it produces a very strong velocity signal of 469 ± 5 metres per second, which was quickly confirmed by Michel Mayor and Didier Queloz from data collected over 15 years. It was later confirmed also by the AFOE Planet Search Team.

The planet and its host star was one of the planetary systems selected by the International Astronomical Union as part of NameExoWorlds, their public process for giving proper names to exoplanets and their host star (where no proper name already exists). The process involved public nomination and voting for the new names, and the IAU planned to announce the new names in mid-December 2015. However, the IAU annulled the vote as the winning name was judged not to conform with the IAU rules for naming exoplanets.

== Orbit and mass ==
VLT's wide-field view of the parent star of Tau Boötis b

Tau Boötis b is rather massive, with a minimum mass over four times that of Jupiter. It orbits the star at a distance less than one seventh that of Mercury's from the Sun. One orbital revolution takes only 3 days 7.5 hours to complete. Because τ Boo is hotter and larger than the Sun and the planet's orbit is so small, it is assumed to be hot. Assuming the planet is perfectly grey with no Greenhouse effect or tidal effects, and a Bond albedo of 0.1, the temperature would be close to 1600 K. Although it has not been detected directly, it is certain that the planet is a gas giant. As Tau Boötis b is more massive than most known "hot Jupiters", it was speculated that it was originally a brown dwarf, a failed star, which could have lost most of its atmosphere from the heat of its larger companion star. However, this seems very unlikely. Still, such a process has actually been detected on the famous transiting planet HD 209458 b.

In December 1999, a group led by Andrew Collier Cameron had announced that they had detected reflected light from the planet. They calculated that the orbit of the planet has an inclination of 29° and thus the absolute mass of the planet would be about 8.5 times that of Jupiter. They also suggested that the planet is blue in color. As a result it was nicknamed the "Millennium Planet" in the media. Unfortunately, their observations could not be confirmed and were later proved to be spurious.

A better estimate came from the assumption of tidal lock with the star, which rotates at 40 degrees; fixing the planet's mass between 6 and 7 Jupiter masses. In 2007, magnetic field detection confirmed this estimate.

In 2012 two teams independently distinguished the radial velocity of the planet from the radial velocity of the star by observing the shifting of the spectral lines of carbon monoxide. This enabled calculation of the inclination of the planet's orbit and hence the planet's mass. One team found an inclination of 44.5±1.5 degrees and a mass of 5.95±0.28 M_{J}. The other team found an inclination of 47_{−6}^{+7} and a mass of 5.6±0.7 M_{J}.

== Characteristics ==
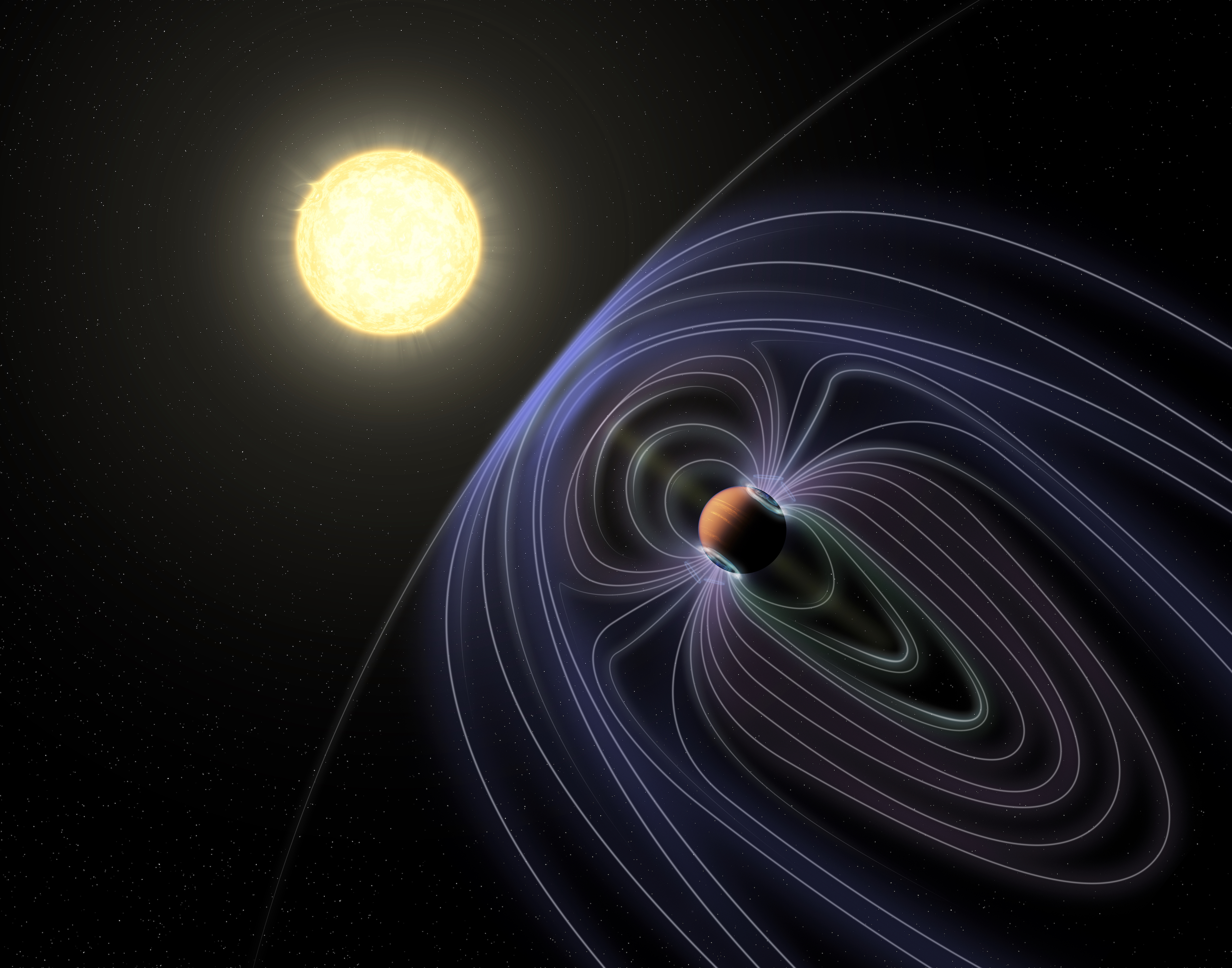
Artist impression of the magnetic field around Tau Boötis b detected in 2020.

The temperature of Tau Boötis b probably inflates its radius higher (1.2 times) than Jupiter's. Since no reflected light has been detected, the planet's albedo must be less than 0.37. The albedo constraint was tightened to less than 0.12 by 2021. At 1600 K, it is (like Mastika) supposed to be hotter than HD 209458 b (formerly predicted 1392K) and possibly even Smertrios (predicted 1540 K from higher albedo 0.3, then actually measured at 2300 K). Tau Boötis b's predicted Sudarsky class is V; which is supposed to yield a highly reflective albedo of 0.55.

It has been a candidate for "near-infrared characterization.... with the VLTI Spectro-Imager". When its atmosphere was measured in 2011, "the new observations indicated an atmosphere with a temperature that falls higher up. This result is the exact opposite of the temperature inversion – an increase in temperature with height – found for other hot Jupiter exoplanets". In 2014, direct detection of water vapor in atmosphere of the planet was announced. Later atmosphere characterization in 2021 have resulted in measured carbon abundance similar to that of Jupiter, in the form of 0.35% carbon monoxide volume admixture to hydrogen-helium atmosphere. The upper limit only of water below 2 parts per million (0.72% of that expected for solar composition) was estimated.

In 2020, a radio emission in the 14-30 MHz band was detected from the Tau Boötis system, likely associated with cyclotron radiation from the poles of Tau Boötis b. This could be a signature of the planet's magnetic field.

== See also ==
- 51 Pegasi b
- 70 Virginis b
- 55 Cancri b
- 47 Ursae Majoris b
- Upsilon Andromedae b
- YZ Ceti another extrasolar planet with evidence of magnetic fields
- HAT-P-11b another extrasolar planet with evidence of magnetic fields
- HD 209458 b another extrasolar planet with evidence of magnetic fields
- List of exoplanets discovered before 2000
