= 55 Cancri Ad =

Extrasolar planet in the constellation Cancer

55 Cancri Ad / Lipperhey
- Radial velocity changes over time of 55 Cancri caused by the orbit of 55 Cancri Ad

Discovery
- Discovered by: Marcy et al.
- Discovery site: California, U.S.
- Discovery date: June 13, 2002
- Detection method: Radial velocity

Orbital characteristics
- Semi-major axis: 5.58+0.24 −0.26 au (835+36 −39 million km)
- Eccentricity: 0.0153+0.0044 −0.0029
- Orbital period (sidereal): 5,084 ± 40 days (13.92 ± 0.11 years)
- Longitude of periastron: 124°+28° −30°
- Time of periastron: 2,452,500.6 ± 230
- Argument of periastron: −156.2°+2.8° −3.0°
- Semi-amplitude: 40.71+0.57 −0.55 m/s (host star)
- Star: 55 Cancri A

Physical characteristics
- Mass: 3.23+0.29 −0.30 M_{J}

55 Cancri Ad (abbreviated 55 Cnc Ad), formally named Lipperhey /ˈlɪpərhiː/, is an extrasolar planet in a long-period orbit around the Sun-like star 55 Cancri A. If confirmed, it would be at a similar distance from its star as Jupiter is from the Sun, and the fifth and outermost known planet in its planetary system. 55 Cancri Ad was discovered on June 13, 2002.

== Name ==
In July 2014 the International Astronomical Union launched NameExoWorlds, a process for giving proper names to certain exoplanets and their host stars. The process involved public nomination and voting for the new names. In December 2015, the IAU announced the winning name was Lippershey for this planet. The winning name was submitted by the Royal Netherlands Association for Meteorology and Astronomy of the Netherlands. It honors the spectacle maker and telescope pioneer Hans Lippershey. In January 2016, in recognition that his actual name was Lipperhey (with Lippershey an error introduced in the 19th century), the exoplanet name was corrected to Lipperhey by the IAU and that name was submitted to the official sites that keep track of astronomical information.

== Discovery ==
Like the majority of known extrasolar planets found at the time, 55 Cancri Ad was detected by observing changes in its star's radial velocity. This was achieved by making sensitive measurements of the Doppler shift of the star's spectrum. At the time of discovery, 55 Cancri A was already known to possess one planet (55 Cancri Ab); however, there was still a drift in the radial velocity measurements which was unaccounted for.

In 2002, further measurements revealed the presence of a long-period planet in an orbit at around 5 AU from the star. The same measurements also indicated the presence of another inner planet, designated 55 Cancri Ac.

In 2025, it was found that the observed radial velocities, corrected for the effects of stellar activity, are also consistent with the presence of only four planets (Ae, Ab, Ac and Af), without the need for a fifth planet, leaving the existence of 55 Cancri Ad uncertain. Other observations, such as by astrometry, are required for confirmation. Astrometric detection was published in 2026, establishing the orbital inclination and true mass.

== Orbit and mass ==
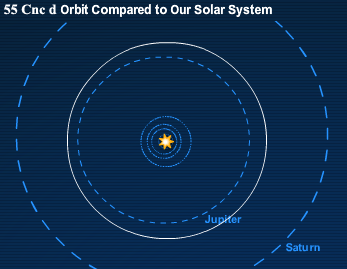
55 Cnc Ad's orbit would be outside of Jupiter's orbit at 5.2 AU.

When 55 Cancri Ad was discovered, it was thought to be on a fairly low eccentricity orbit similar to Jupiter in the Solar System, though the orbital elements were not well determined. As more data were collected, the best-fit solution for this planet turned out to be highly eccentric, more so than any of the planets in the Solar System. In 2008, after a complete orbit of this planet had been observed, the true orbit was revealed, indicating that as had been originally suspected, the planet's 14-year orbit was in fact near-circular, located about 5.77 AU from the star.

A limitation of the radial velocity method used to discover 55 Cancri Ad is that only a lower limit on the planet's mass can be obtained. In the case of 55 Cancri Ad, this lower limit was around 3.835 times the mass of Jupiter (M_{J}). In 2004, preliminary astrometric measurements with the Fine Guidance Sensors on the Hubble Space Telescope suggest that the planet's orbit is inclined by around 53° with respect to the plane of the sky. If this measurement is confirmed, it implies that the planet's true mass is 25% greater than the lower limit, at around 4.8 Jupiter masses; and that 55 Cancri d is not coplanar with the innermost planets e and b (both at about 85°). This measurement is dependent on the planet's orbital period, estimate for which have significantly changed since 2004. A 2026 study using astrometry from the Hipparcos and Gaia spacecraft found a true mass of 3.23+0.29
−0.30 M_{J} and an inclination of 94°±7°, consistent with the inclination of the stellar spin axis and consequently with an aligned orbital configuration.

== Characteristics ==
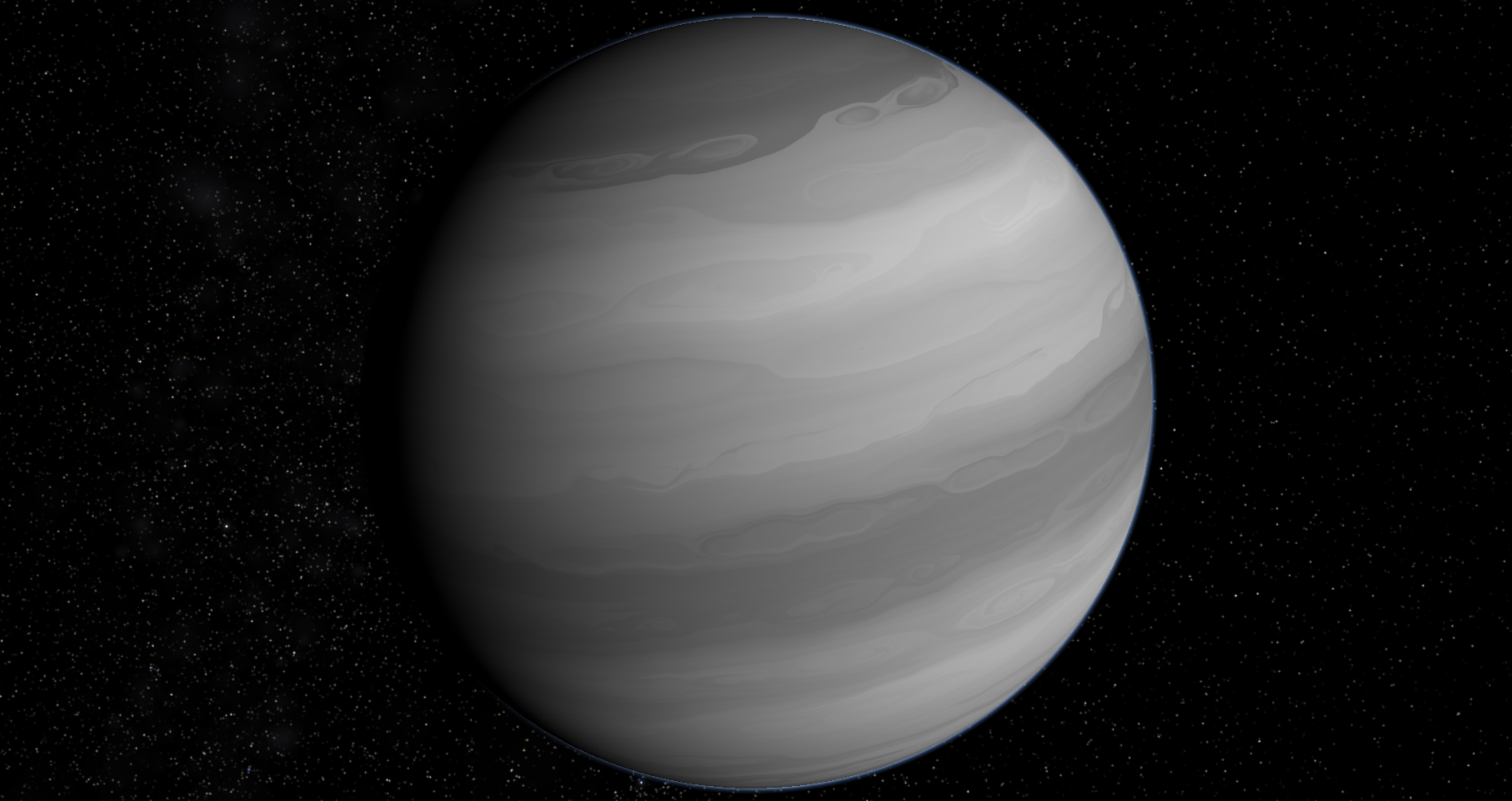
An artist's impression of 55 Cancri Ad

Given the planet's high mass, the planet is a gas giant with no solid surface. Since the planet has only been detected indirectly, parameters such as its radius, composition and temperature are unknown.

Assuming a composition similar to that of Jupiter and that the planet's atmosphere is close to chemical equilibrium, it is predicted that 55 Cancri Ad is covered in a layer of water clouds: the planet's internal heat probably keeps it too warm to form the ammonia-based clouds that are typical of Jupiter. Its surface gravity is likely to be about 4 to 5 times stronger than Jupiter, or about 10 to 15 times that of Earth which is because the radius of the planet is unlikely to be much more than Jupiter's and is probably slightly smaller than Jupiter due to the high metal content in the parent star.

== See also ==
- Appearance of extrasolar planets
- Cancer (Chinese astronomy)
- Lists of exoplanets
- Gliese 1132 b – rocky exoplanet with a confirmed atmosphere
- Mu Arae c – at constellation Ara
- Planetary system
