= 70 Virginis =

Star in the constellation Virgo

- Location of 70 Virginis (circled in red)

Observation data Epoch J2000.0 Equinox ICRS
- Constellation: Virgo
- Right ascension: 13^{h} 28^{m} 25.8086^{s}
- Declination: +13° 46′ 43.638″
- Apparent magnitude (V): +4.97

Characteristics
- Evolutionary stage: subgiant
- Spectral type: G4 V-IV
- U−B color index: 0.26
- B−V color index: 0.714±0.007
- V−R color index: 0.39
- R−I color index: 0.36

Astrometry
Radial velocity (R_{v})	4.44±0.13 km/s
Proper motion (μ)	RA: −235.951(75) mas/yr Dec.: −575.969(32) mas/yr
Parallax (π)	55.2511±0.0779 mas
Distance	59.03 ± 0.08 ly (18.10 ± 0.03 pc)
Absolute magnitude (M_{V})	+3.70±0.01

Details
Mass	1.09±0.02 M_{☉}
Radius	1.942±0.008 R_{☉}
Luminosity	3.047±0.043 L_{☉}
Surface gravity (log g)	3.94±0.08 cgs
Temperature	5,473±32 K
Metallicity [Fe/H]	−0.06±0.01 dex
Rotational velocity (v sin i)	1.56±0.50 km/s
Age	7.77±0.51 Gyr

Other designations
- 70 Vir, BD+14°2621, GJ 512.1, GJ 9446, HD 117176, HIP 65721, HR 5072, SAO 100582, WDS 13284+1347A

Database references
SIMBAD	data
Exoplanet Archive	data
ARICNS	data

70 Virginis is a binary star located 59 light years from the Sun in the equatorial constellation of Virgo, near the northern constellation border with Coma Berenices. 70 Virginis is its Flamsteed designation. The star is visible to the naked eye as a faint, yellow-hued point of light with an apparent visual magnitude of +4.97. It is drifting further away with a heliocentric radial velocity of +4.4 km/s and has a high proper motion, traversing the celestial sphere at the rate of 0.621 arc seconds per annum.

This object has a stellar classification of G4 V-IV, being rather unusually bright for a main sequence star of its type and thus may be just starting to evolve into the subgiant phase. It is an estimated 7.9 billion years old and is spinning with a projected rotational velocity of 4.8 km/s. The star has 1.09 times the mass of the Sun and 1.94 times the Sun's radius. It is radiating 3.05 times the luminosity of the Sun from its photosphere at an effective temperature of 5,473 K. The metallicity – a term astronomers use to describe the abundance of elements heavier than helium – is near solar.

In 2011, a star was discovered 2.86 arcseconds away from the primary, and is likely associated with 70 Virginis. Based on its properties, it has a spectral type later than M5V, and has a mass of about 8% that of the Sun. There is also an L-type brown dwarf 42.7 arcseconds away from the primary, but it is unclear whether this is bound to the system.

In 1996, 70 Virginis was discovered to have an extrasolar planet in orbit around it. There is also an orbiting dusty disc with an average temperature of 153 K located at a mean distance of 3.4 AU from the star.

== Planetary system ==
The discovery of the planet around 70 Virginis was announced on January 17, 1996 at the meeting of the American Astronomical Society in San Antonio, Texas. The planet was detected using radial velocity measurements taken with the C. Donald Shane telescope at Lick Observatory. It has an orbital period of 117 days, an eccentricity of 0.4, and a mass at least 7.4 times that of Jupiter.

The 70 Virginis planetary system
Companion (in order from star)	Mass	Semimajor axis (AU)	Orbital period (days)	Eccentricity	Inclination (°)	Radius
b	>7.352±0.002 M_{J}	0.4809564+0.0000004 −0.0000003	116.6927±0.0001	0.3978±0.0002	—	—
Dust disc	>3.4 AU				—	—
