= Mu Arae d =

Extrasolar planet orbiting the star Mu Arae

Mu Arae d / Rocinante
Discovery
- Discovered by: Goździewski et al. Mayor, Pepe
- Discovery site: Chile South America
- Discovery date: August 5, 2006
- Detection method: Doppler Spectroscopy

Orbital characteristics
- Apastron: 0.9823 AU (146,950,000 km)
- Periastron: 0.8597 AU (128,610,000 km)
- Semi-major axis: 0.9210 AU (137,780,000 km)
- Eccentricity: 0.0666 ± 0.0122
- Orbital period (sidereal): 310.55 ± 0.83 d 0.8502 y
- Time of periastron: 2452708.7 ± 8.3
- Argument of periastron: 189.6 ± 9.4
- Semi-amplitude: 14.91 ± 0.59
- Star: Mu Arae

Mu Arae d, also known as HD 160691 d, formally named Rocinante /ˌrɒsəˈnæntiː/, is an extrasolar planet orbiting the star Mu Arae of the constellation Ara.

== Characteristics ==
The planet has a mass about half that of Jupiter and orbits at a distance of 0.921 AU from the star with a period of 310.55 days. The planet may be located at a distance close enough to the star to receive a comparable amount of ultraviolet radiation as the Earth does from the Sun. However, it is too close to the star to be able to support liquid water at its surface. Furthermore, given its mass, the planet is likely to be a gas giant with no solid surface.

== Name ==
In July 2014 the International Astronomical Union launched NameExoWorlds, a process for giving proper names to certain exoplanets and their host stars. The process involved public nomination and voting for the new names. In December 2015, the IAU announced the winning name was Rocinante for this planet. The winning name was submitted by the Planetario de Pamplona, Spain. Rocinante was the horse of the lead character of the novel Don Quixote.
