= 55 Cancri Ae =

Hot Super-Earth orbiting 55 Cancri A

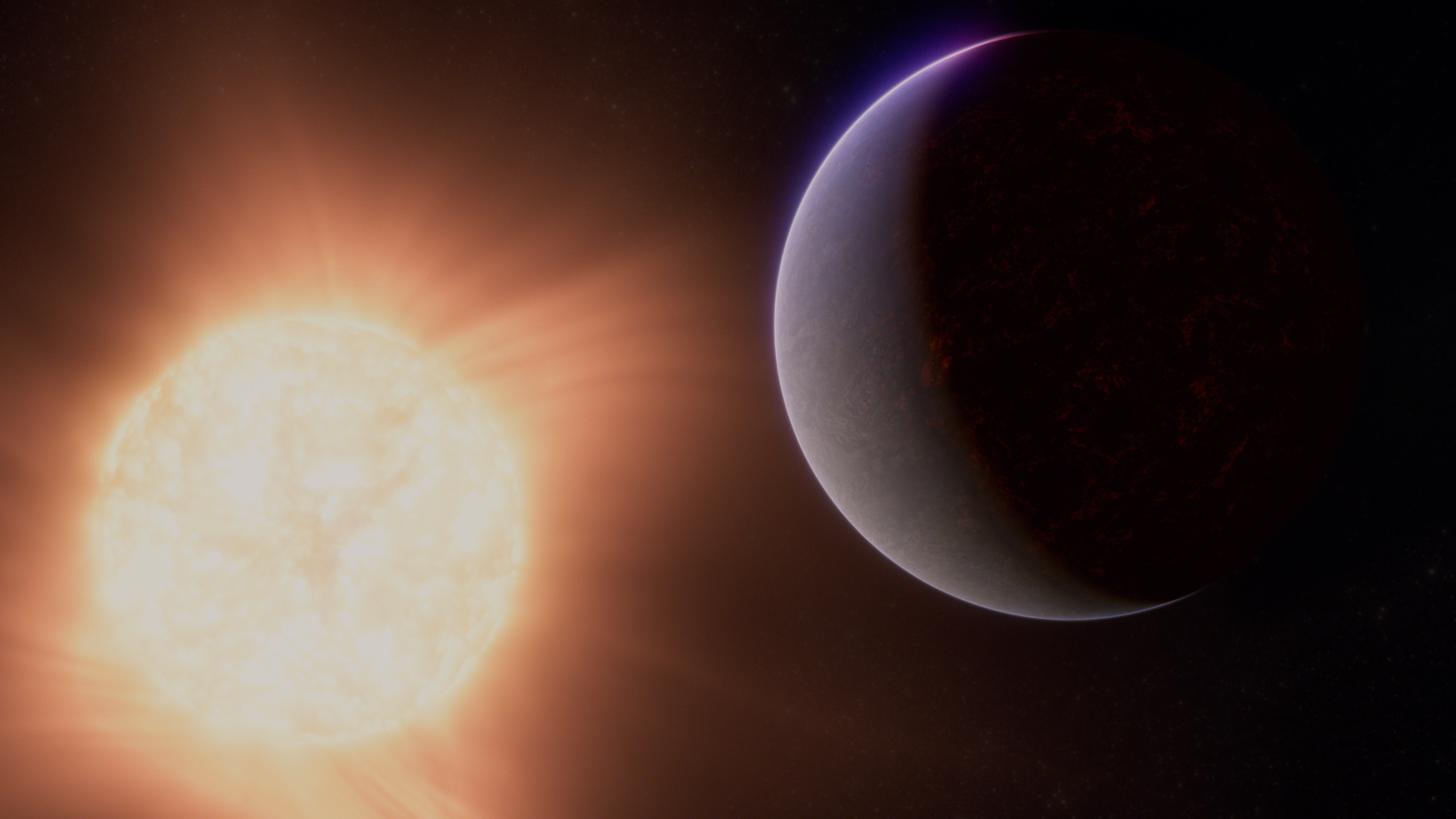
- Artist's impression of 55 Cancri Ae near its host star

Discovery
- Discovered by: McArthur et al.
- Discovery site: McDonald Observatory
- Discovery date: 2004 (announced); 2003–2004 (discovery data)
- Detection method: Radial velocity

Designations
- Named after: Zacharias Janssen
- Alternative names: Janssen, TOI-1773.01

Orbital characteristics
- Semi-major axis: 0.01596151 ± 0.00000011 AU (2,387,808 ± 16 km)
- Eccentricity: 0.01+0.02 −0.01
- Orbital period (sidereal): 0.73654625(15) d 17.67711 h
- Inclination: 83.9°+0.6° −0.5°
- Time of periastron: 2,455,500.2546±0.005
- Argument of periastron: 2.1±1.9 radians
- Semi-amplitude: 6.55±0.21 m/s (host star)
- Star: 55 Cancri A

Physical characteristics
- Mean radius: 1.856+0.024 −0.025 R_{🜨}
- Mass: 7.74+0.37 −0.30 M_{🜨}
- Mean density: 6.25+0.74 −0.70 g cm^{−3}
- Surface gravity: 2.273 g
- Temperature: 3,771+669 −520 K (3,498 °C; 6,328 °F, dayside) <1,649 K (1,376 °C; 2,509 °F, nightside)

Atmosphere
- Composition by volume: Likely CO and CO_{2}, likely with PO, N_{2} and/or H_{2}O

55 Cancri Ae (abbreviated 55 Cnc Ae), officially named Janssen (/ˈjɒnsən/), is an exoplanet orbiting a Sun-like host star, 55 Cancri A. The mass of the exoplanet is about eight Earth masses and its diameter is about twice that of the Earth. 55 Cancri Ae was discovered in data taken during 2003–2004 and announced in 2004, thus making it the first super-Earth discovered around a main sequence star, predating Gliese 876 d by a year. It is the innermost planet in its planetary system, taking less than 18 hours to complete an orbit. However, until the 2010 observations and recalculations, this planet had been thought to take about 2.8 days to orbit the star.

Due to its proximity to its star, 55 Cancri Ae is extremely hot, with temperatures on the day side exceeding 3,000 Kelvin. The planet's thermal emission is observed to be variable, possibly as a result of volcanic activity. It has been proposed that 55 Cancri Ae could be a carbon planet.

The atmosphere of 55 Cancri Ae has been extensively studied, with varying results. Initial studies suggested an atmosphere rich in hydrogen and helium, but later studies failed to confirm this, instead supporting an atmosphere composed of heavier molecules, possibly only a thin atmosphere of vaporized rock. Most recently as of 2024, JWST observations have ruled out the rock vapor atmosphere scenario and provided evidence for a substantial atmosphere rich in carbon dioxide or carbon monoxide.

== Name ==
In July 2014, the International Astronomical Union (IAU) launched NameExoWorlds, a process for giving proper names to certain exoplanets and their host stars. The process involved public nomination and voting for the new names. In December 2015, the IAU announced the winning name was Janssen for this planet. The winning name was submitted by the Royal Netherlands Association for Meteorology and Astronomy of the Netherlands. It honors the spectacle maker Zacharias Janssen who is sometimes associated with the invention of the telescope.

== Discovery ==
55 Cancri Ae was discovered in 2004 by a team of astronomers led by Barbara E. McArthur, using data taken with the Hobby–Eberly Telescope at McDonald Observatory in Davis Mountains, Texas. Like the majority of extrasolar planets found prior to the Kepler mission, 55 Cancri Ae was discovered by detecting variations in its star's radial velocity. This was achieved by making sensitive measurements of the Doppler shift of the spectrum of 55 Cancri A. At the time of its discovery, three other planets were known orbiting the star. After accounting for these planets, a signal at around 2.8 days remained, which could be explained by a planet of at least 14.2 Earth masses in a very close orbit.

The same measurements were used to confirm the existence of the uncertain planet 55 Cancri Ac. 55 Cancri Ae was one of the first extrasolar planets with a mass comparable to that of Neptune to be discovered. It was announced at the same time as Gliese 436 b, another "hot Neptune" orbiting the red dwarf star Gliese 436.

=== Planet challenged ===
In 2005, the existence of planet e was questioned by Jack Wisdom in a reanalysis of the data. He suggested that the 2.8-day planet was an alias and, separately, that there was a 260-day planet in orbit around 55 Cancri. In 2008, Fischer et al. published a new analysis that appeared to confirm the existence of the 2.8-day planet and the 260-day planet. However, the 2.8-day planet was shown to be an alias by Dawson and Fabrycky in 2010; its true period was 0.7365 days.

=== Transit ===
The planet's transit of its host star was announced on 27 April 2011, based on two weeks of nearly continuous photometric monitoring with the MOST space telescope. The transits occur with the period (0.74 days) and phase that had been predicted by Dawson and Fabrycky. This is one of the few planetary transits to be confirmed around a well-known star, and allowed investigations into the planet's composition.

== Orbit and rotation ==
55 Cancri Ae orbits very close to its parent star; with average orbital distance of 0.01544 ± 0.00005 AU, it takes only 18 hours to complete an orbit. Analysis of its transits reveal that its orbital inclination is about 83.6°, and appears to be close to being aligned with the rotation of its parent star, with obliquity of 23 ^{+14°}_{−12°}, favouring dynamically gentle inward migration scenarios for this planet. 55 Cancri Ae may also be coplanar with the next planet in the system, 55 Cancri Ab.

Due to its old age and proximity to the star, the planet is extremely likely to be tidally locked, meaning that one hemisphere, referred to as dayside, permanently faces the star, while the other, the nightside, always faces away from it.

== Characteristics ==
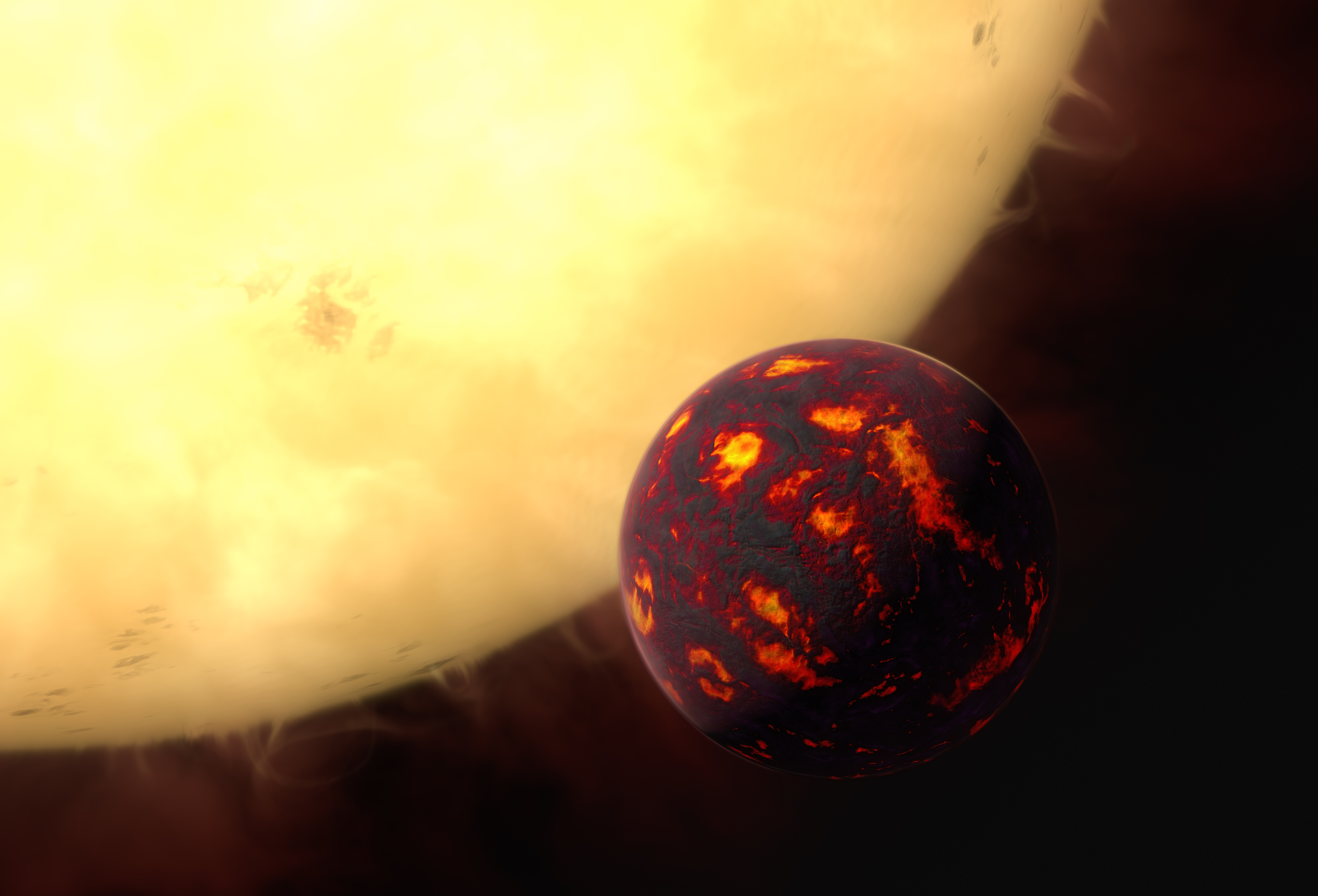
Artist's impression of 55 Cancri Ae as a lava planet

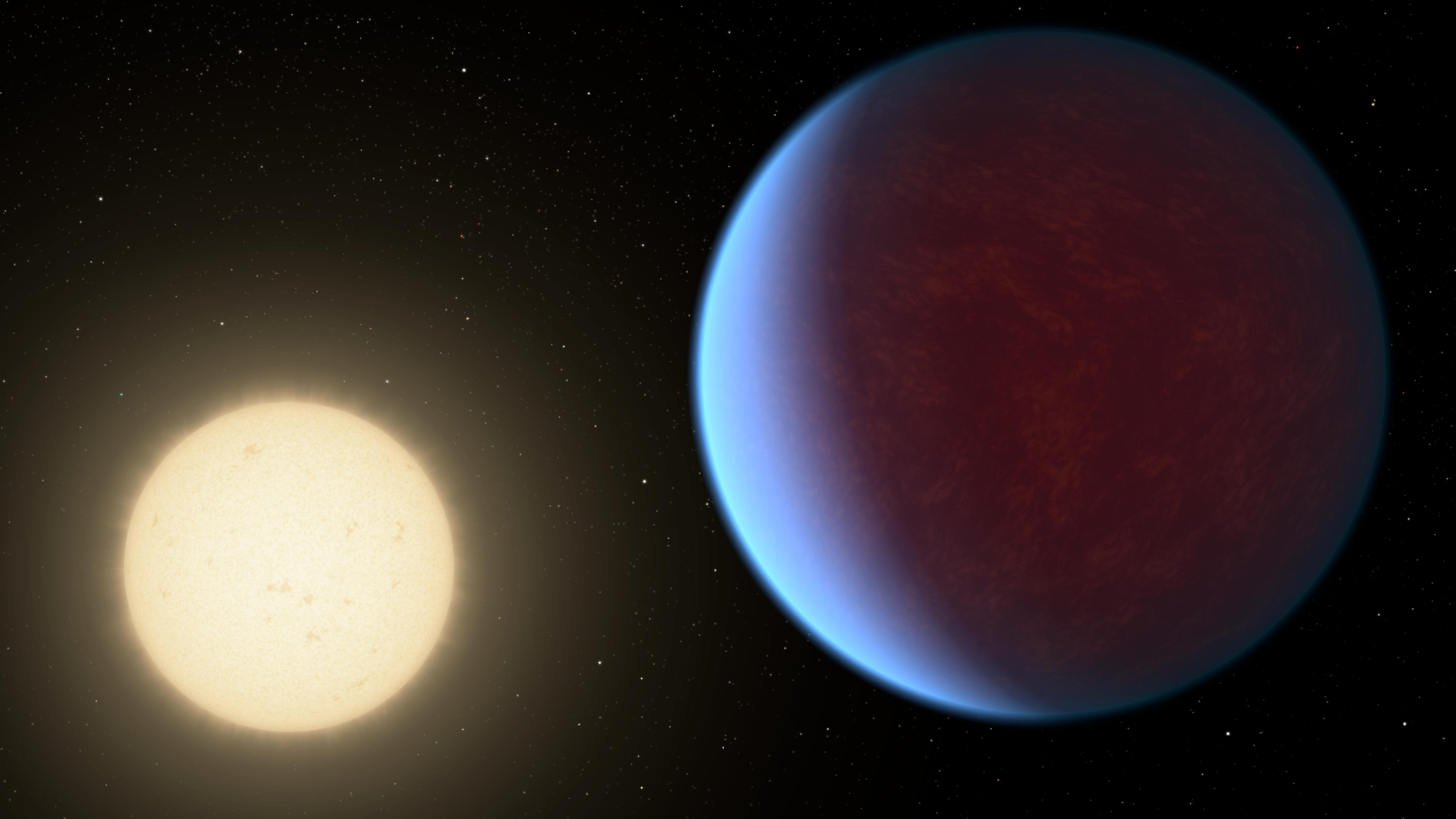
Artist's impression of 55 Cancri Ae with a thick atmosphere

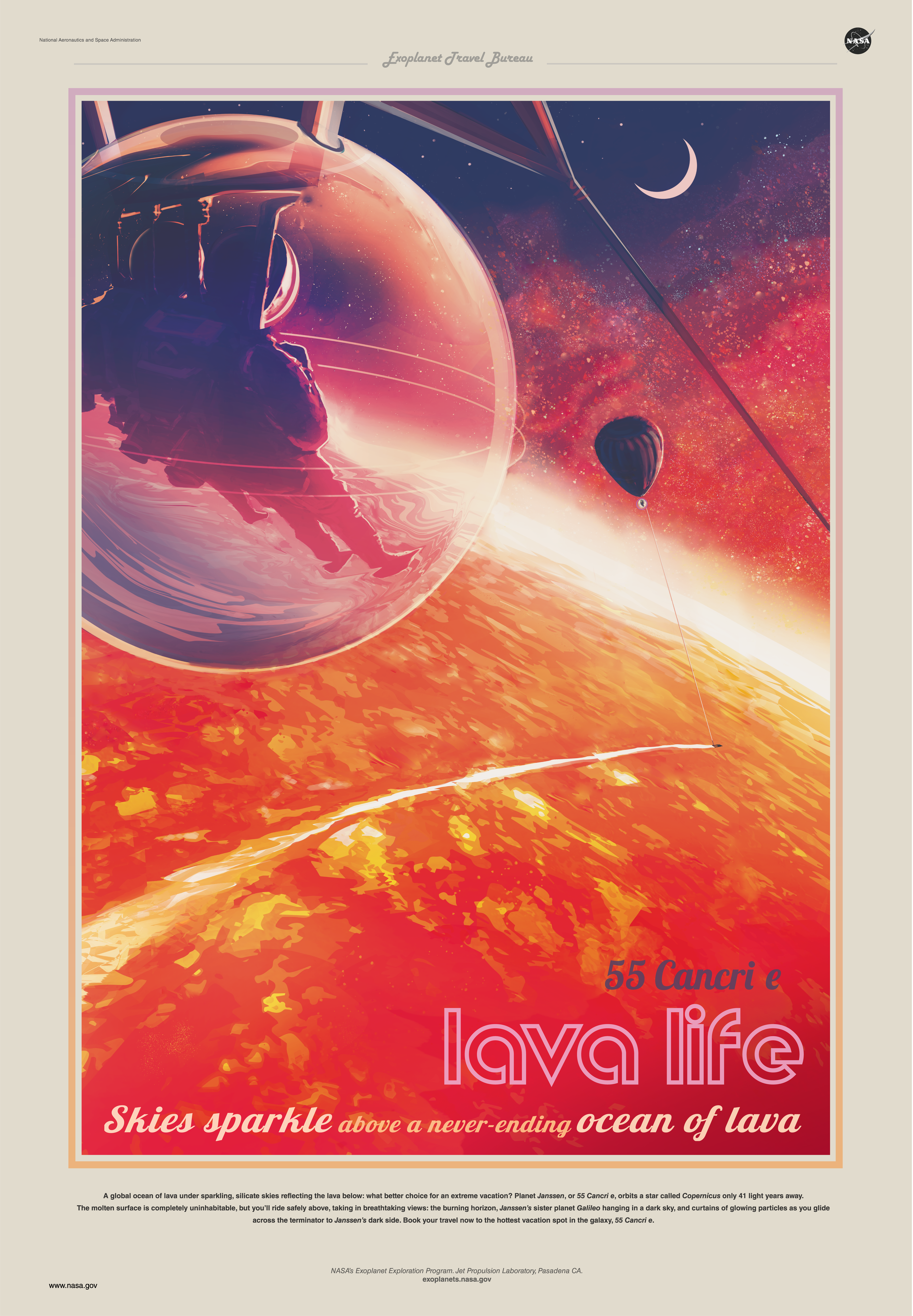
NASA "Exoplanet Travel Bureau" poster for 55 Cancri Ae

55 Cancri Ae receives more radiation than Gliese 436 b, discovered in the same year. The side of the planet facing its star has temperatures more than 2,000 Kelvin (approximately 1,700 degrees Celsius or 3,100 Fahrenheit), hot enough to melt iron. Infrared mapping with the Spitzer Space Telescope indicated an average day-side temperature of 2,700 K (2,430 °C; 4,400 °F) and an average night-side temperature of around 1,380 K (1,110 °C; 2,020 °F). Reanalysis of the Spitzer data in 2022 found a hotter day-side temperature of 3,770 K (3,500 °C; 6,330 °F) and set an upper limit of 1,650 K (1,380 °C; 2,510 °F) on the night-side temperature.

=== Composition ===
It was initially unknown whether 55 Cancri Ae was a small gas giant like Neptune or a large rocky terrestrial planet. In 2011, a transit of the planet was confirmed, allowing scientists to calculate its density. At first it was suspected to be a water planet. As initial observations showed no hydrogen in its Lyman-alpha signature during transit, Ehrenreich speculated that its volatile materials might be carbon dioxide instead of water or hydrogen.

An alternative possibility is that 55 Cancri Ae is a solid planet made of carbon-rich material rather than the oxygen-rich material that makes up the terrestrial planets in the Solar System. In this case, roughly a third of the planet's mass would be carbon, much of which may be in the form of diamond as a result of the temperatures and pressures in the planet's interior. Further observations are necessary to confirm the nature of the planet.

A third argument is that the tidal forces, together with the orbital and rotational centrifugal forces, can partially confine a hydrogen-rich atmosphere on the nightside. Assuming an atmosphere dominated by volcanic species and a large amount of hydrogen, the heavier molecules could be confined within latitudes <80° while the more volatile hydrogen is not. Because of this disparity, the hydrogen would have to slowly diffuse out into the dayside where X-ray and ultraviolet irradiation would destroy it. In order for this mechanism to have taken effect, it is necessary for 55 Cancri Ae to have become tidally locked before losing the totality of its hydrogen envelope. This model is consistent with spectroscopic measurements claiming to have discovered the presence of hydrogen and with other studies which were unable to discover a significant hydrogen-destruction rate.

=== Atmosphere ===
In February 2016, it was announced that NASA's Hubble Space Telescope had detected hydrogen cyanide, but no water vapor, in the atmosphere of 55 Cancri Ae, which is only possible if the atmosphere is predominantly hydrogen or helium. This is the first time the atmosphere of a super-Earth exoplanet was analyzed successfully. In November 2017, it was announced that infrared observations with the Spitzer Space Telescope indicated the presence of a global lava ocean obscured by an atmosphere with a pressure of about 1.4 bar, slightly thicker than that of Earth. The atmosphere may contain similar chemicals in Earth's atmosphere, such as nitrogen and possibly oxygen, in order to cause the infrared data observed by Spitzer. In contradiction to the February 2016 findings, a spectroscopic study in 2012 failed to detect escaping hydrogen from the atmosphere, and a spectroscopic study in 2020 failed to detect escaping helium, indicating that the planet probably has no primordial atmosphere. Atmospheres made of heavier molecules such as oxygen and nitrogen are not ruled out by these data.

A study published in May 2024 used observations from the James Webb Space Telescope's Near-InfraRed Camera and Mid-Infrared Instrument to produce a thermal emission spectrum of 55 Cancri e within the range of 4 to 12 μm. These measurements ruled out the hypothesis that the planet is a lava world covered by a "tenuous atmosphere made of vaporized rock", as previously proposed, and indicated a "bona fide volatile atmosphere likely rich in CO_{2} or CO". The authors stated that 55 Cancri Ae's magma ocean could be outgassing and sustaining this atmosphere.

=== Volcanism ===
Large surface-temperature variations on 55 Cancri Ae have been attributed to possible volcanic activity releasing large clouds of dust which blanket the planet and block thermal emissions. By 2022, the observation had shown a large variability in the planetary transit depths, which can be attributed to large-scale volcanism, or to the presence of a variable gas torus co-orbital with the planet.

=== Search for radio emissions ===
Since 55 Cancri Ae orbits less than 0.1 AU from its host star, some scientists hypothesized that it may cause stellar flaring synchronized to the orbital period of the exoplanet. A 2011 search for these magnetic star-planet interactions that would result in coronal radio emissions resulted in no detected signal.

== See also ==
- Appearance of extrasolar planets
- Lists of exoplanets
- GJ 1132 b
- Mu Arae c
- Planetary system
- TOI-561 b, another super-Earth with evidence of an atmosphere
