= Geoffrey Marcy =

American astronomer

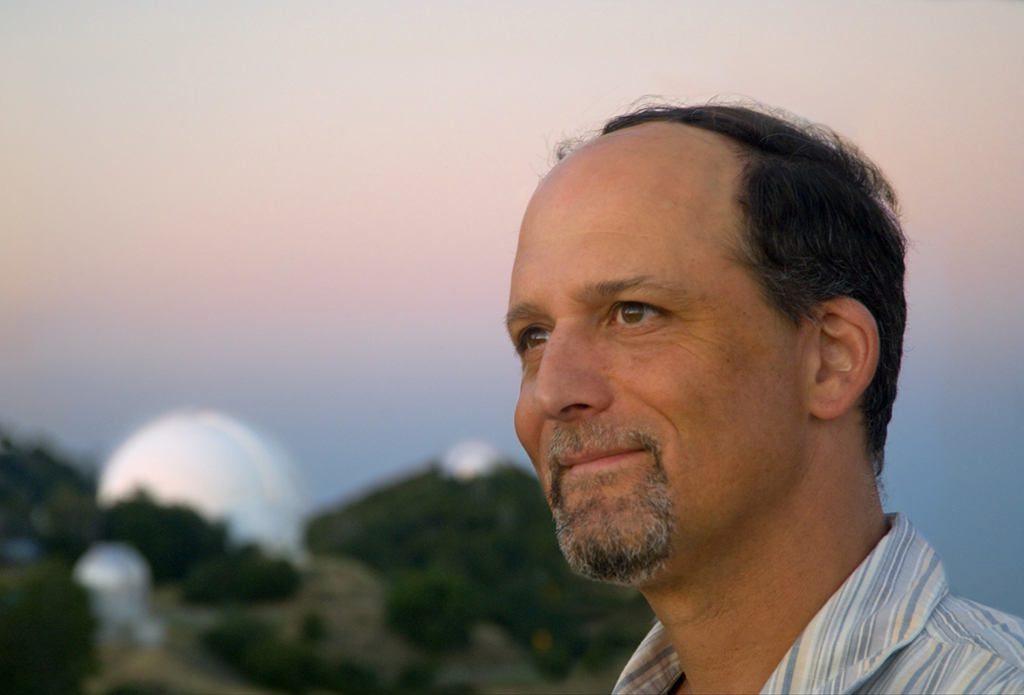
- Marcy in 2007
- Born: Geoffrey William Marcy; September 29, 1954 (age 72); St. Clair Shores, Michigan, U.S.
- Education: University of California, Los Angeles (B.A.); University of California, Santa Cruz (Ph.D.)
- Known for: Exoplanet discoveries
- Awards: Henry Draper Medal (2001); Beatrice M. Tinsley Prize (2002); Shaw Prize (2005)
- Scientific career
- Fields: Astronomy, astrophysics
- Workplaces: Carnegie Institution for Science; San Francisco State University; University of California, Berkeley
- Doctoral advisors: George H. Herbig and Steven S. Vogt

Geoffrey William Marcy (born September 29, 1954) is an American astronomer. He was an early influence in the field of exoplanet detection, discovery, and characterization. Marcy was a professor of astronomy at the University of California, Berkeley, and an adjunct professor of physics and astronomy at San Francisco State University. Marcy and his research teams discovered many extrasolar planets, including 70 out of the first 100 known exoplanets and also the first planetary system around a Sun-like star, Upsilon Andromedae. Marcy was a co-investigator on the NASA Kepler space telescope mission. His collaborators have included R. Paul Butler, Debra Fischer and Steven S. Vogt, Jason Wright, Andrew Howard, Katie Peek, John Johnson, Erik Petigura, Lauren Weiss, Lea Hirsch and the Kepler Science Team. Following an investigation for sexual harassment in 2015, Marcy resigned his position at the University of California, Berkeley.

== Early life and education ==
Marcy graduated from Granada Hills High School in Granada Hills, California, in 1972. He graduated with a Bachelor of Arts summa cum laude with a double major in physics and astronomy from the University of California, Los Angeles, in 1976. He then completed a doctorate in astronomy in 1982 at the University of California, Santa Cruz, with much of his work done at Lick Observatory.

== Academic career ==
Marcy has held teaching and research positions, first at the Carnegie Institution of Washington (then the Mt. Wilson and Las Campanas Observatories) as a Carnegie fellow from 1982 to 1984. He then worked as an associate professor of physics and astronomy from 1984 to 1996 and then as a distinguished university professor from 1997 to 1999 at the San Francisco State University.

Marcy was a professor of astronomy and the Watson and Marilyn Alberts Chair for SETI at the University of California, Berkeley, from 1999 through 2015. From 2000 to 2012, he was the director of UC Berkeley's Center for Integrative Planetary Science. Marcy was also one of the project leaders of the Breakthrough Initiatives that will search for intelligent life in the universe, using large radio and optical telescopes.

Marcy and his team confirmed Michel Mayor and Didier Queloz's discovery of the first extrasolar planet orbiting a Sun-like star—51 Pegasi b. Two months later, Marcy and his team announced the discovery of two additional planets around 47 Ursae Majoris and 70 Virginis. Other achievements include discovering the first multiple planet system around a star similar to our own (Upsilon Andromedae), the first transiting planet around another star, simultaneously with David Charbonneau and Timothy Brown (HD 209458 b), the first extrasolar planet orbiting beyond five AU (55 Cancri d), and the first Neptune-sized planets (Gliese 436b and 55 Cancri e). Marcy was a co-investigator of the NASA Kepler mission that discovered over 4000 exoplanets, most being smaller than four times the size of Earth. His team, led by Erik Petigura and Andrew Howard, showed that approximately 20% of Sun-like stars have a planet of one to two times the size of Earth and receive incident stellar light within a factor of four of the light the Earth receives from the Sun, making them warm planets, many of which accommodate liquid water.

=== Later career ===
In May 2017, Marcy co-authored studies related to laser light emissions from stars, as a way of detecting technology-related signals from an alien civilization. The study included Tabby's Star (KIC 8462852), an oddly dimming star whose unusual light fluctuations may be the result of interference by an artificial megastructure, such as a Dyson swarm, made by such a civilization. No evidence was found for technology-related signals from Tabby's Star in the studies.

In 2021, Marcy's membership in the National Academy of Sciences was rescinded.

== Sexual harassment ==
A six-month investigation by the University of California, Berkeley, Title IX office concluded in 2015 with the finding that Marcy had violated the university's sexual harassment policy between 2001 and 2010. Four complaints were filed with the university's Title IX office, one of which Marcy denied. As a consequence, the university "imposed real consequences on Professor Geoff Marcy by establishing a zero tolerance policy regarding future behavior and by stripping him of the procedural protections that all other faculty members enjoy".

At least three additional allegations had been made against Marcy as early as 1995 while he was at San Francisco State University, as corroborated by Penny Nixon, then SFSU's sexual harassment officer. A former graduate student of Marcy, now faculty member at Harvard, called Marcy's harassing behavior an "open secret" in the astronomy community. Marcy's alleged actions included unwanted massages, kisses, and groping.

On October 7, 2015, Marcy posted an "Open Letter to the Astronomy Community" stating "While I do not agree with each complaint that was made, it is clear that my behavior was unwelcomed by some women. I take full responsibility and hold myself completely accountable for my actions and the impact they had. For that and to the women affected, I sincerely apologize."

On October 12, 2015, the UC Berkeley Astronomy Department met and released a statement asserting that Marcy was "inadequately disciplined" by the university, and "we believe that Geoff Marcy cannot perform the functions of a faculty member."

On the same day, Marcy resigned as principal investigator of the Breakthrough Listen project. Two days later, on October 14, 2015, he indicated his intention to step down from his professorship at UC Berkeley. Marcy retained the title of emeritus despite his resignation.

In 2023, a paper co-authored by Marcy with the American Astronomical Society drew criticism from graduate students who had collected data for the project but were not offered co-authorship. As harassment, including sexual harassment, is not classified as research misconduct by the group, Marcy's name was not disincluded from the paper. One of Marcy's junior collaborators in Sweden published an essay stating that she is subjected to harassment, bullying, and discrimination from the astronomy community for her decision to work with Marcy.

== Personal ==
Marcy lives with his wife, Susan Kegley, in California.

== In the media ==
Earlier, and as a pioneer in the study of extrasolar planets, Marcy has been featured prominently in the media, including Time magazine, The New York Times, Astronomy, and as a participant in various PBS Nova episodes: "Hunt for Alien Worlds" (1997), "Finding Life Beyond Earth" (2012), "Alien Planets Revealed" (2014); a BBC Horizon episode: "The Planet Hunters" (1996) and History Channel programs: The Universe (2007). Marcy was also featured on ABC News Nightline (October 20, 1995), The MacNeil-Lehrer News Hour (January 18, 1996), The David Letterman Show (April 12, 2001), a Planetary Radio interview (2007) and a National Academy of Sciences interview (2014).

== Honors ==
- ABC News: "Person of the Week"' (January 26, 1996)
- California Scientist of the Year (2000)
- Henry Draper Medal of the National Academy of Sciences with R. Paul Butler (2001)
- Elected member of the National Academy of Sciences (2002)
- Beatrice M. Tinsley Prize from the American Astronomical Society (2002)
- NASA Medal for Exceptional Scientific Achievement (2003)
- Discover magazine: Space Scientist of the Year (2003)
- Shaw Prize with Michel Mayor (2005)
- On October 28, 2006, he received an honorary doctorate in science from the University of Delaware.
- Carl Sagan Prize for Science Popularization from Wonderfest (2009)
- Fellow of the American Academy of Arts and Sciences (2010)
- PNAS Cozzarelli Prize recipient, with Erik Petigura and Andrew Howard (2013)
- On June 9, 2012, he received an honorary doctorate in science from the University of Chicago.
- Named the 2015 Miller Senior Fellow of the Miller Institute at the University of California Berkeley.

== See also ==
- List of stars with confirmed planets
- Sexual harassment in education
