= Tau Boötis =

Star in the constellation Boötes

τ Boötis
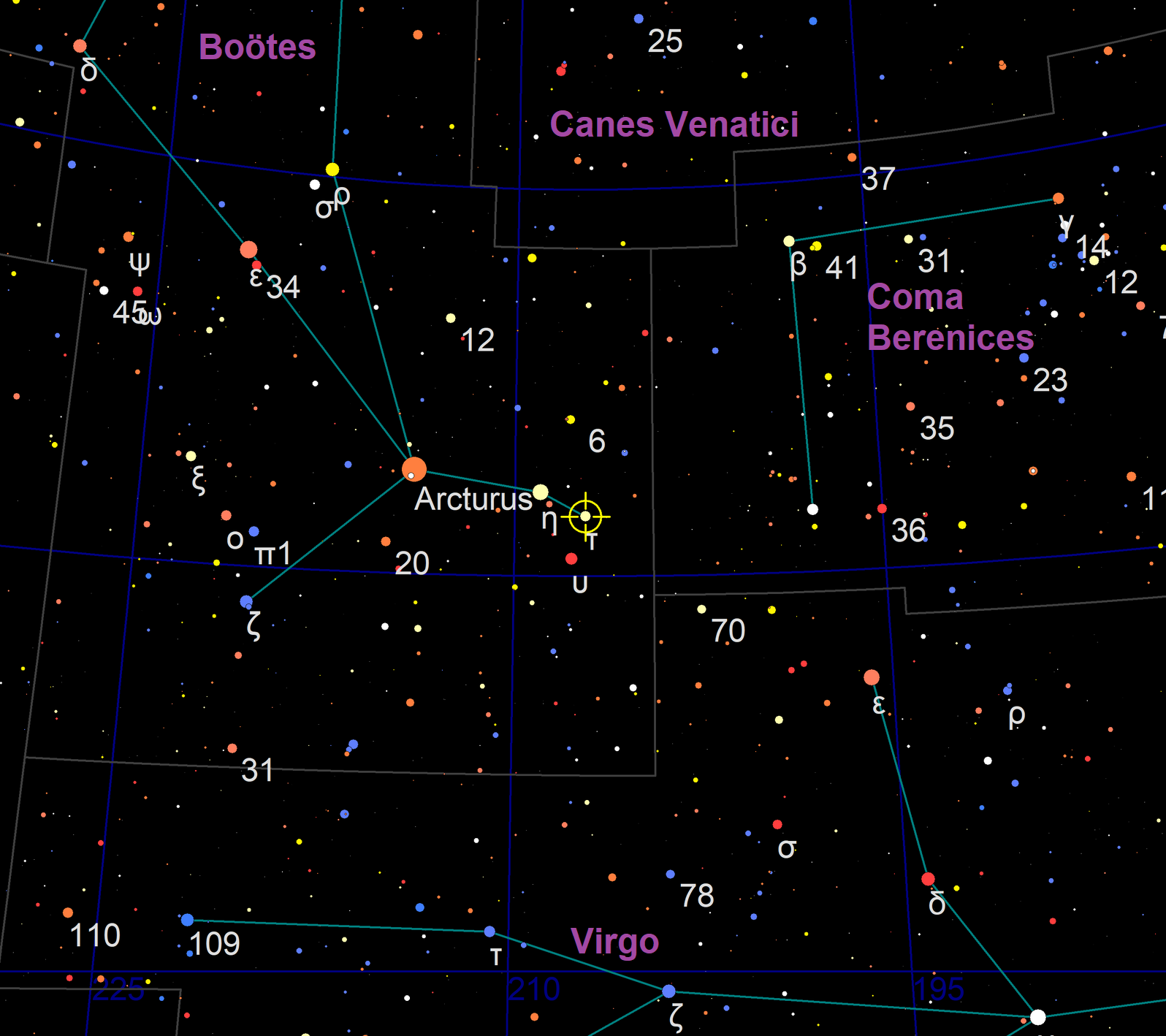
- Location of τ Boötis (circled)

Observation data Epoch J2000 Equinox ICRS
- Constellation: Boötes
- Right ascension: 13^{h} 47^{m} 15.7382^{s}
- Declination: +17° 27′ 24.810″
- Apparent magnitude (V): 4.50 (4.46 to 4.52)

Characteristics
- Evolutionary stage: Main sequence
- Spectral type: F6V + M2
- B−V color index: 0.48
- Variable type: Suspected

Astrometry
Radial velocity (R_{v})	−16.75±0.15 km/s
Proper motion (μ)	RA: −468.923(95) mas/yr Dec.: +63.469(74) mas/yr
Parallax (π)	64.0470±0.1093 mas
Distance	50.92 ± 0.09 ly (15.61 ± 0.03 pc)
Absolute magnitude (M_{V})	3.38

Orbit
Primary	τ Boo A
Secondary	τ Boo B
Period (P)	2020+450 −509 yr
Semi-major axis (a)	197+31 −30 au
Eccentricity (e)	0.870+0.023 −0.017
Inclination (i)	43.2±1.1°
Longitude of the node (Ω)	4.294+2.192 −2.068°
Argument of periastron (ω) (secondary)	127±4°

Details

τ Boo A
Mass	1.358+0.025 −0.030 M_{☉}
Radius	1.38±0.08 R_{☉}
Luminosity	3.2±0.1 L_{☉}
Habitable zone inner limit	1.38±0.07 au
Habitable zone outer limit	2.77±0.04 au
Surface gravity (log g)	4.27±0.06 cgs
Temperature	6,556±197 K
Metallicity [Fe/H]	+0.26±0.03 dex
Rotation	3.2±0.2 days
Rotational velocity (v sin i)	14.27±0.06 km/s
Age	0.9±0.5 and <3.00 Gyr

τ Boo B
Mass	0.504±0.011 M_{☉}
Radius	0.48±0.05 R_{☉}
Surface gravity (log g)	4.90 cgs
Temperature	3,580±90 K
Metallicity [Fe/H]	+0.21 dex
Rotational velocity (v sin i)	5.0 km/s

Other designations
- Tepiamenit, τ Boo, 4 Boötis, NSV 6444, BD+18°2782, FK5 507, GC 18637, GJ 527, HD 120136, HIP 67275, HR 5185, SAO 100706, ADS 9025, CCDM 13473+1727, WDS J13473+1727A, LTT 14021

Database references
SIMBAD	data
- A
- B
Exoplanet Archive	data

Tau Boötis, Latinised from τ Boötis and formally named Tepiamenit, is a wide binary star system in the northern constellation of Boötes. This system is visible to the naked eye at a point of light with a combined apparent visual magnitude of 4.50. Based on parallax measurements, It is located at a distance of approximately 51 light-years (16 pc) from the Earth. This system is drifting closer to the Sun with a radial velocity of −16 km/s.

The primary component is an ordinary F-type main-sequence star that is larger, brighter, and more massive than the Sun, while the secondary is a faint red dwarf. In 1999, an extrasolar planet was detected orbiting the primary star.

== Nomenclature ==
Tau Boötis is a Bayer designation that is Latinised from τ Boötis, and abbreviated Tau Boo or τ Boo.

The name Tepiamenit, of ancient Egyptian origin, was adopted for the primary component Tau Boötis A, by the IAU Working Group on Star Names on 15 April 2026. Menit, the pole or mooring post, was an ancient Egyptian constellation appearing in the Ramesside star clocks; it marked the northern celestial and ecliptic poles in the 2nd millennium BCE. Tepiamenit, the predecessor of the pole, referred to an asterism in the area of Tau Boötis.

=== Naming controversy ===
This star and its planet were one of the planetary systems selected by the International Astronomical Union as part of NameExoWorlds, their public process for giving proper names to exoplanets and their host star (where no proper name already exists). The process involved public nomination and voting for the new names, and the IAU announced the new names in mid-December 2015.

However, the IAU annulled the vote for this system, as the winning names ("Shri Ram Matt" for the star and "Bhagavatidevi" for the planet) were judged not to conform with the IAU rules for naming exoplanets due to the political activities of the namesake people. The names garnered the majority of the votes cast for the system, and made up a significant proportion of all votes cast as part of the contest. The IAU later assigned the name Tepiamenit to the primary component Tau Boötis A on April 15th 2026.

== Stellar components ==
VLT's wide-field view of Tau Boötis

The primary component is a yellow-white F-type main-sequence star with a stellar classification of F6V. It is 35 percent more massive and 42 percent larger than the Sun. The star is radiating three times the luminosity of the Sun from its photosphere at an effective temperature of 6,387 K. It is about 1.3 billion years old, making it younger than the Sun. Since it is more massive than the Sun, its lifespan is shorter—less than 6 billion years. This star is spinning with a projected rotational velocity of 14.3 km/s, completing a rotation every three days.

The primary is the first star apart from the Sun to be observed changing the polarity of its magnetic field. It is listed as a suspected variable star. The magnetic activity cycle for this star shows a period of 122 days—much shorter than the solar cycle.

The secondary companion is a dim, 11th magnitude red dwarf of spectral type M2. It only about half the mass and radius of the Sun. The stars orbit each other at a typical distance of about 220 AU (14 arcseconds) but come as close as about 28 AU during periapsis, giving its orbit a very high eccentricity of about 0.87. One orbit around the primary would take approximately 2,400 years to complete, although this period is poorly constrained.

== Planetary system ==
In 1996 the exoplanet Tau Boötis b was discovered orbiting the primary star by a team of astronomers led by R. Paul Butler. It has six times the mass of Jupiter and is orbiting the star with a period of 3.3 days. Tau Boötis and its planet appear to be tidally locked to each other. In 2014, water vapor was discovered in the atmosphere of this hot Jupiter.

There are indications of a second planet orbiting the star with a period of roughly 5,000 days; however, this could be due to an instrumental effect or a stellar magnetic activity cycle. Because this is a highly eccentric binary star system, the maximum exoplanetary orbit around the primary that is dynamically stable for long periods has a semimajor axis of 4.86 au.

The Tau Boötis A planetary system
Companion (in order from star)	Mass	Semimajor axis (AU)	Orbital period (days)	Eccentricity	Inclination (°)	Radius
b	5.95±0.28 M_{J}	0.049±0.003	3.3124568(69)	0.011±0.006	44.5±1.5	—

== See also ==
- List of exoplanets discovered before 2000 - Tau Boötis b
