= Mu Arae c =

Extrasolar planet orbiting Mu Arae in the constellation of Ara

Mu Arae c / Dulcinea
Discovery
- Discovered by: Santos, Bouchy; Mayor, Pepe
- Discovery site: La Silla Observatory, Chile
- Discovery date: August 25, 2004
- Detection method: HARPS

Orbital characteristics
- Apastron: 0.10659 AU (15.946 million km)
- Periastron: 0.07529 AU (11.263 million km)
- Semi-major axis: 0.09094 AU (13.604 million km)
- Eccentricity: 0.172 ± 0.040
- Orbital period (sidereal): 9.6386 ± 0.0015 d 0.02639 y
- Time of periastron: 2,452,991.1 ± 0.4
- Argument of periastron: 212.7 ± 13.3
- Semi-amplitude: 3.06 ± 0.13
- Star: Mu Arae

Mu Arae c, also known as HD 160691 c, formally named Dulcinea (pronounced /dʌlˈsɪniə/ or /dʌlsɪˈniːə/), is an extrasolar planet orbiting the star Mu Arae of the constellation Ara. It was the first 'hot Neptune' to be discovered.

None of the four planets orbiting Mu Arae are directly visible from Earth using currently available tools. All four were found using the radial velocity method of extrasolar planet detection.

== Discovery ==
The planet's discovery was announced on August 25, 2004. At the time, its minimum mass was reported at just 14 times that of Earth, although later work established a value of 10.5 Earth masses. It orbits very close to Mu Arae, completing one revolution every 9.6 days. The discovery was made with the aid of the High Accuracy Radial Velocity Planet Searcher (HARPS) spectrograph, at the European Southern Observatory's La Silla Observatory in Chile. The data that revealed the presence of this planet was gathered on 8 nights of observations in June 2004.

== Name ==
In July 2014 the International Astronomical Union (IAU) launched NameExoWorlds, a process for giving proper names to certain exoplanets and their host stars. The process involved public nomination and voting for the new names. In December 2015, the IAU announced the winning name was Dulcinea for this planet. The winning name was submitted by the Planetario de Pamplona, Spain. Dulcinea was the love interest of the lead character of the novel Don Quixote.

== Characteristics ==
Assuming its true mass is comparable to those of Neptune and Gliese 436 b, the authors of the discovery paper speculated that Mu Arae c could be a terrestrial planet, though they expect a gaseous envelope to compose 5-10% of its mass. A rocky planet this size could possibly have formed, since Mu Arae has a higher metallicity than the Sun. Also, it is thought to have formed well inside the system's "snow line" at 3.2 AU. However, various models of the system's formation have since converged that the planet attracted large amounts of volatiles before its star had cleared out the ice, and that it now has a core of only six Earth masses. Its core is likely enveloped in so much hot ice and gas that the planet would behave more like Neptune. Indeed, it is now understood that planets this massive are rarely rocky.

Mu Arae c is too far from its star to be subject to coronal mass ejections. There is disagreement as to whether it is and has always been a hot Neptune in mass (Lammer), or if it could have developed from a gas giant, losing most of its mass on the way (Baraffe).

If an eroded gas giant, the star would have boiled the planet from a larger protoplanet, of 20 Earth masses up to half Jupiter's mass. If the latter, its current radius could be as high as 0.6 Jupiter.

The planet must be hot because of its proximity to its star. The discoverers chose for it an albedo of 0.35, lighter than albedos chosen to calculate the temperatures of hot Jupiters such as Tau Boötis b. This was perhaps due to the discoverers' assumption that the planet would be a silicate super-terrestrial with neither clouds nor a deep Rayleigh scattering atmosphere. If so the surface temperature would be about 900 K.

== See also ==
- 55 Cancri e
- Gliese 436 b
