= Sudarsky's gas giant classification =

Sudarsky classification as used in Celestia.

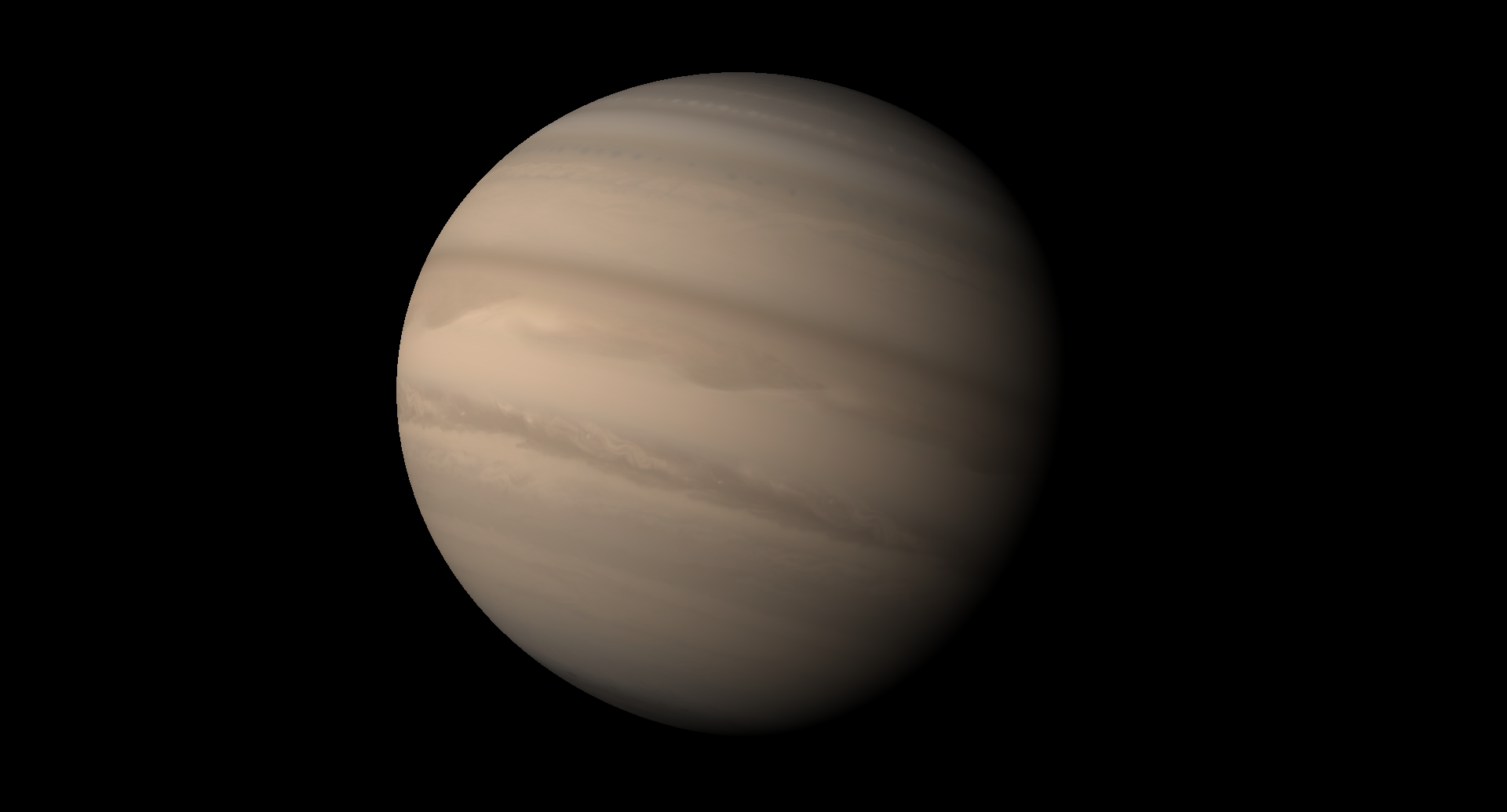
Class I

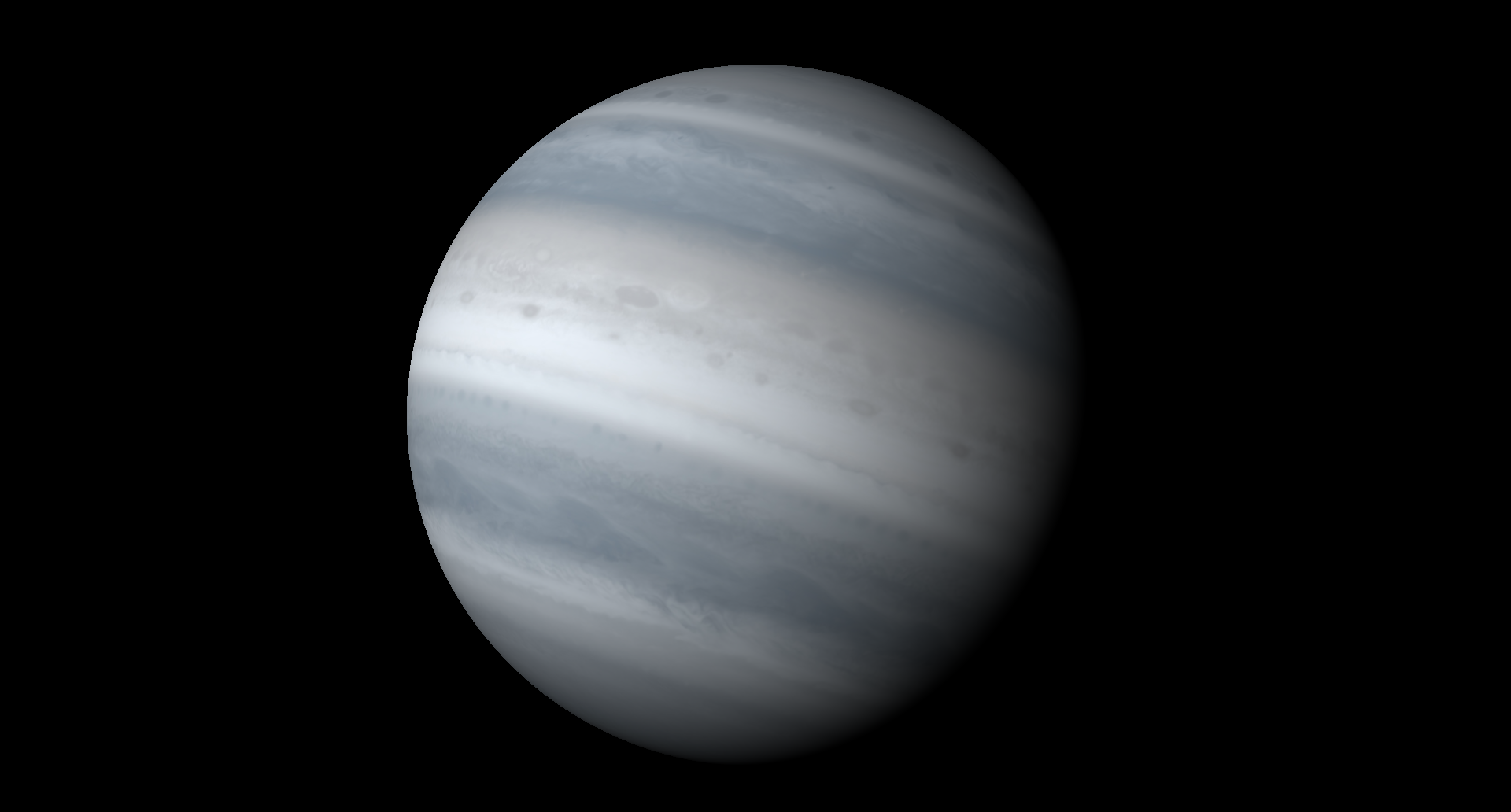
Class II

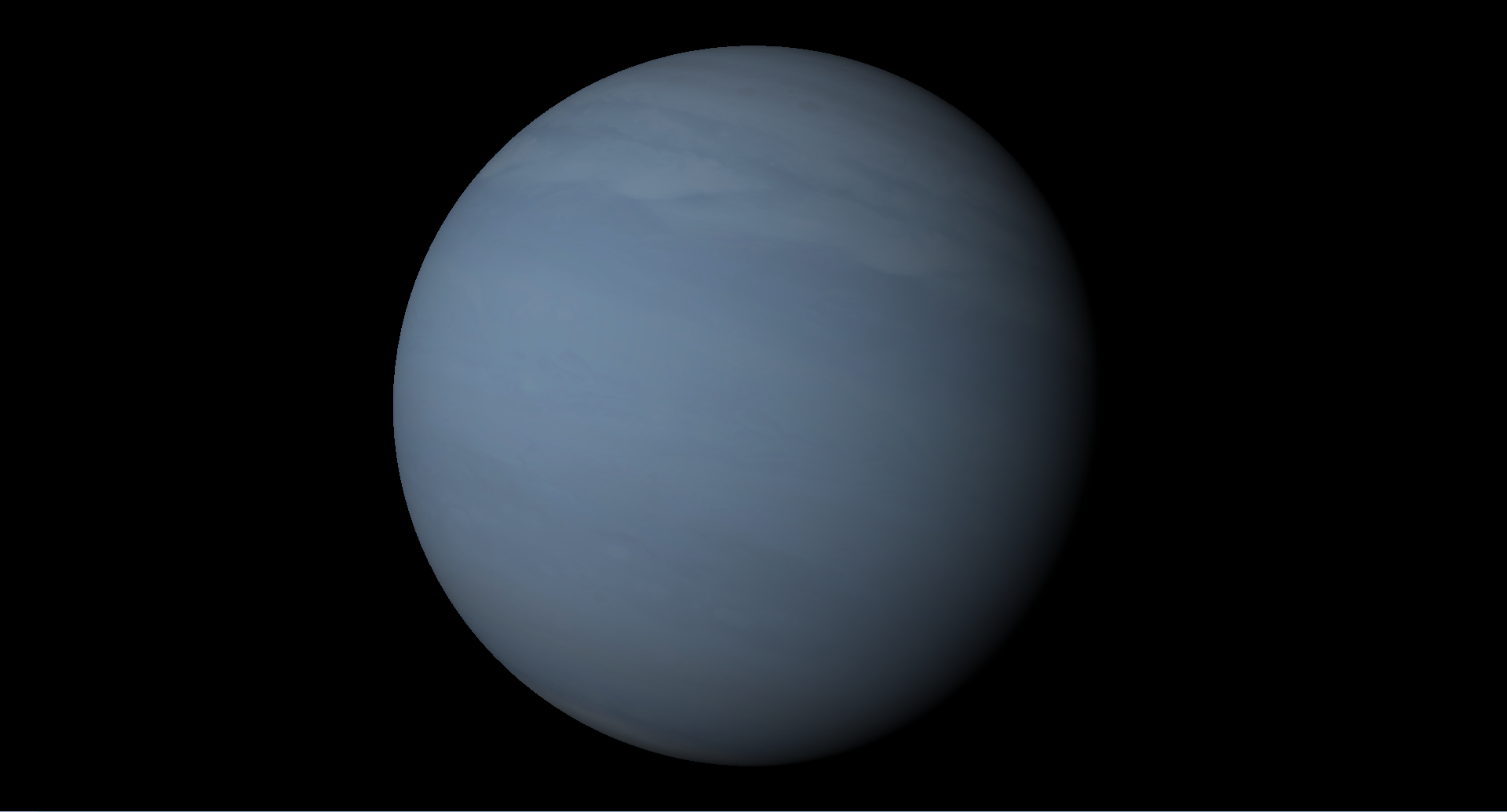
Class III

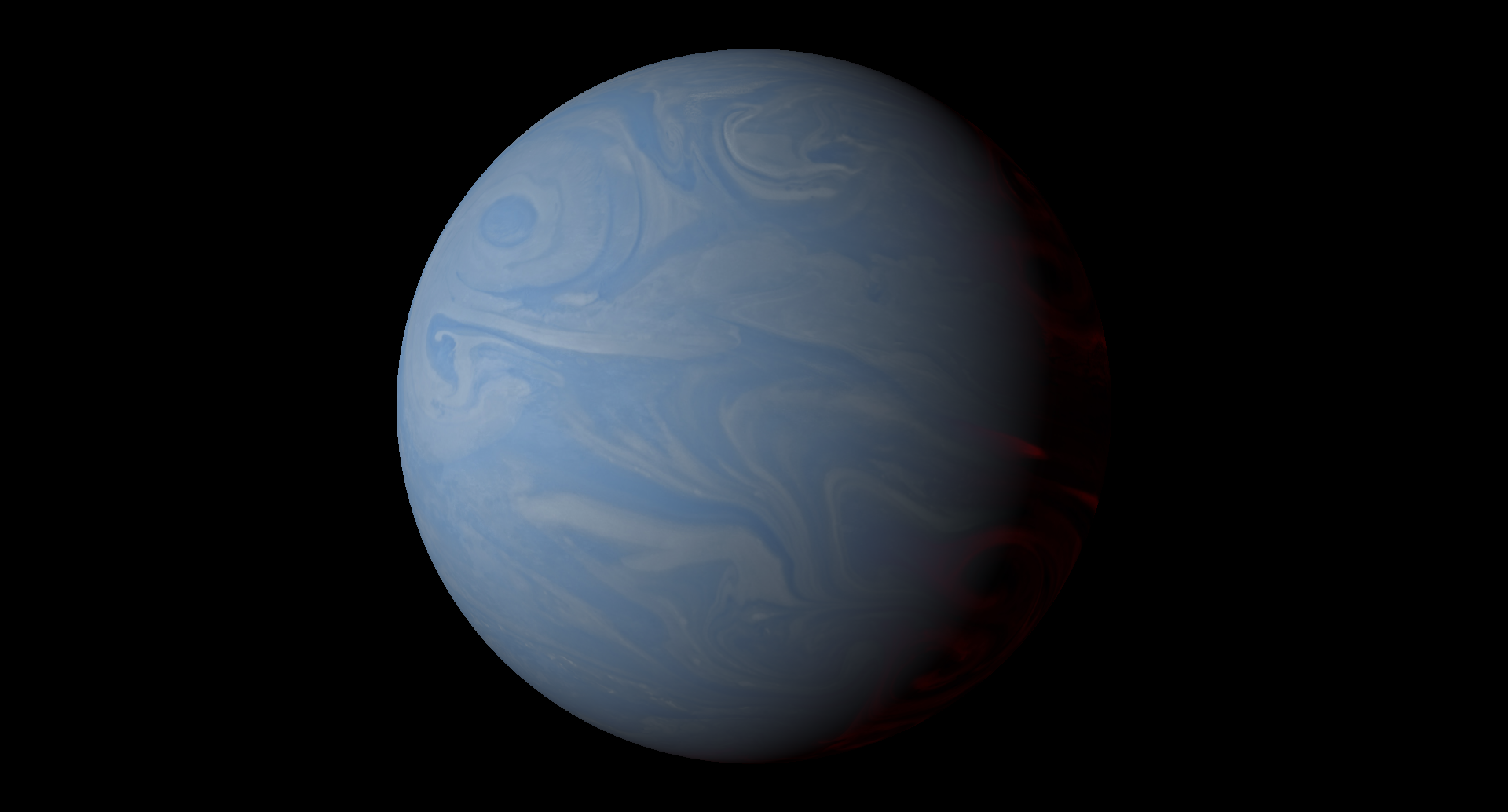
Class IV

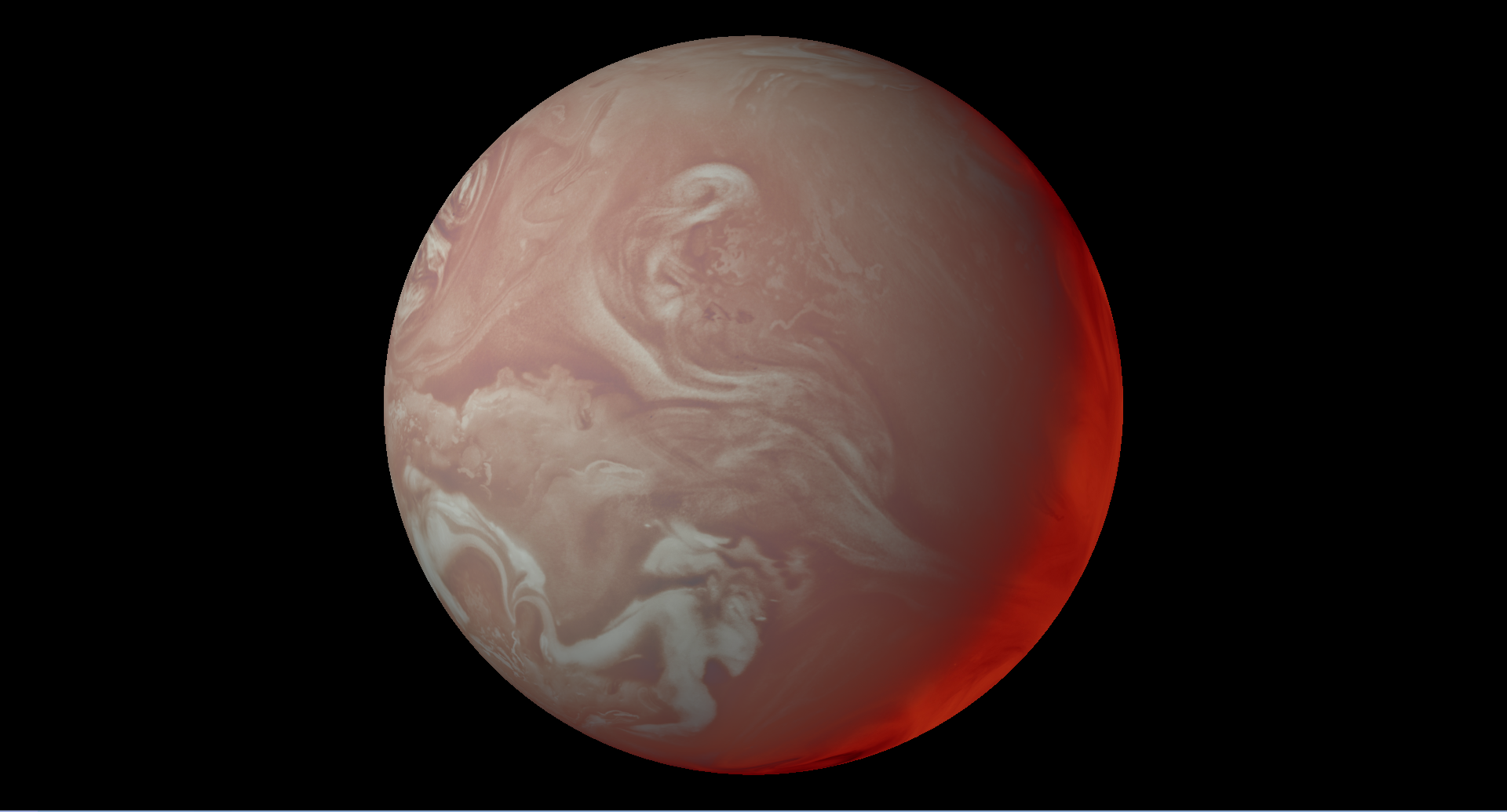
Class V

Sudarsky's classification of gas giants for the purpose of predicting their appearance based on their temperature was outlined by David Sudarsky and colleagues in the paper Albedo and Reflection Spectra of Extrasolar Giant Planets and expanded on in Theoretical Spectra and Atmospheres of Extrasolar Giant Planets, published before any successful direct or indirect observation of an extrasolar planet atmosphere was made. It is a broad classification system with the goal of bringing some order to the likely rich variety of extrasolar gas-giant atmospheres.

Gas giants are split into five classes (numbered using Roman numerals) according to their modeled physical atmospheric properties. In the Solar System, only Jupiter and Saturn are within the Sudarsky classification, and both are Class I. The appearance of planets that are not gas giants cannot be predicted by the Sudarsky system, for example terrestrial planets such as Earth and Venus, or ice giants such as Uranus (14 Earth masses) and Neptune (17 Earth masses).

== Background ==
The appearance of extrasolar planets is largely unknown because of the difficulty in making direct observations. In addition, analogies with planets in the Solar System can apply to few of the extrasolar planets known because most are wholly unlike any of our planets, for example, the hot Jupiters.

Bodies that transit their star can be spectrographically mapped, for instance HD 189733 b. That planet has further been shown to be blue with an albedo greater (brighter) than 0.14. Most planets so mapped have been large and close-orbiting "hot Jupiters".

Speculation on the appearances of unseen extrasolar planets currently relies upon computational models of the likely atmosphere of such a planet, for instance how the atmospheric temperature–pressure profile and composition would respond to varying degrees of insolation.

== Planetary classes ==
=== Class I: Ammonia clouds ===
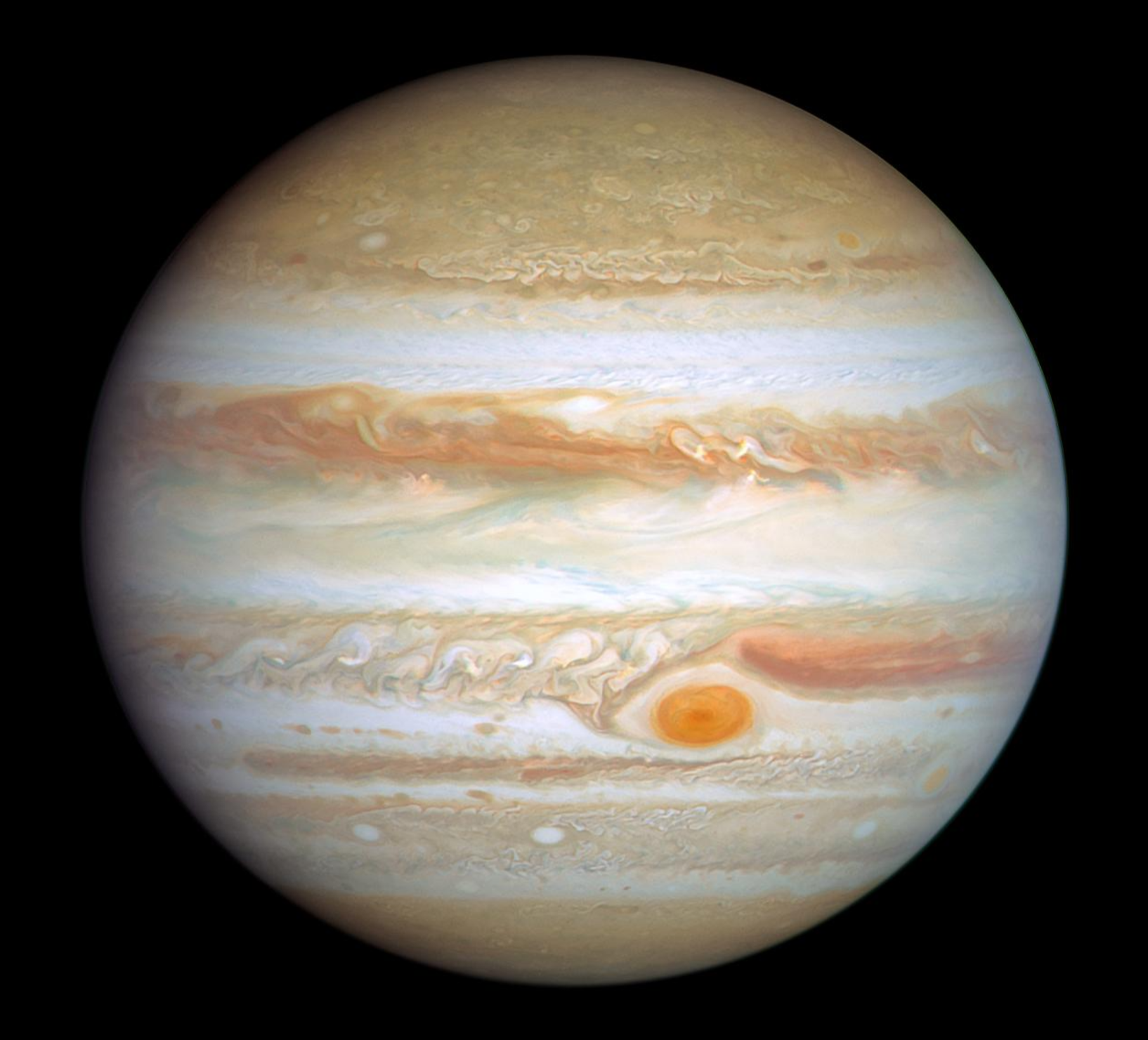
Jupiter and Saturn, two Sudarsky class I gas giants.

Gaseous giants in this class have appearances dominated by ammonia clouds. These planets are found in the outer regions of a planetary system. They exist at temperatures less than about 150 K (−120 °C; −190 °F). The predicted Bond albedo of a class I planet around a star like the Sun is 0.57, compared with a value of 0.343 for Jupiter and 0.342 for Saturn. The discrepancy can be partially accounted for by taking into account non-equilibrium condensates such as tholins or phosphorus, which are responsible for the coloured clouds in the Jovian atmosphere, and are not modelled in the calculations.

The temperatures for a class I planet requires either a cool star or a distant orbit. The former may mean the star(s) are too dim to be visible, where the latter may mean the orbits are so large that their effect is too subtle to be detected until several observations of those orbits' complete "years" (cf. Kepler's third law). The increased mass of superjovians would make them easier to observe, however a superjovian of comparable age to Jupiter would have more internal heating, which could push it to a higher class.

=== Class II: Water clouds ===
Gaseous giants in class II are too warm to form ammonia clouds; instead their clouds are made up of water ice. These characteristics are expected for planets with temperatures below around 250 K (−23 °C; −10 °F). Water clouds are more reflective than ammonia clouds, and the predicted Bond albedo of a class II planet around a Sun-like star is 0.81. Even though the clouds on such a planet would be similar to those of Earth, the atmosphere would still consist mainly of hydrogen and hydrogen-rich molecules such as methane.

Sudarsky et al. listed Epsilon Eridani b, Upsilon Andromedae d, and 55 Cancri Ad as possible Class II planets.

=== Class III: Cloudless ===
Gaseous giants with equilibrium temperatures between about 350 K (170 °F, 80 °C) and 800 K (980 °F, 530 °C) do not form global cloud cover, because they lack suitable chemicals in the atmosphere to form clouds. (They would not form sulfuric acid clouds like Venus due to excess hydrogen.) These planets would appear as featureless azure-blue globes because of Rayleigh scattering and absorption by methane in their atmospheres, appearing like Jovian-mass versions of Uranus and Neptune. Because of the lack of a reflective cloud layer, the Bond albedo is low, around 0.12 for a class-III planet around a Sun-like star. They exist in the inner regions of a planetary system, roughly corresponding to the location of Mercury.

Sudarsky et al. listed Upsilon Andromedae c, Gliese 876 b, and Gliese 876 c as possible Class III planets. Above 700 K (800 °F, 430 °C), sulfides and chlorides might provide cirrus-like clouds.

=== Class IV: Alkali metals ===
Above 900 K (630 °C/1160 °F), carbon monoxide becomes the dominant carbon-carrying molecule in a gas giant's atmosphere (rather than methane). Furthermore, the abundance of alkali metals, such as sodium substantially increase, and spectral lines of sodium and potassium are predicted to be prominent in a gas giant's spectrum. These planets form cloud decks of silicates and iron deep in their atmospheres, but this is not predicted to affect their spectrum. The Bond albedo of a class IV planet around a Sun-like star is predicted to be very low, at 0.03 because of the strong absorption by alkali metals. Gas giants of classes IV and V are referred to as hot Jupiters.

Sudarsky et al. listed 55 Cancri Ab as a possible Class IV planet.

HD 209458 b at 1300 K (1000 °C) would be another such planet, with a geometric albedo of, within error limits, zero; and in 2001, NASA witnessed atmospheric sodium in its transit, though less than predicted. This planet hosts an upper cloud deck absorbing so much heat that below it is a relatively cool stratosphere. The composition of this dark cloud, in the models, is assumed to be titanium/vanadium oxide (sometimes abbreviated "TiVO"), by analogy with red dwarfs, but its true composition is yet unknown; it could well be as per Sudarsky.

=== Class V: Silicate clouds ===
For the very hottest gas giants, with temperatures above 1400 K (2100 °F, 1100 °C) or cooler planets with lower gravity than Jupiter, the silicate and iron cloud decks are predicted to lie high up in the atmosphere. The predicted Bond albedo of a class V planet around a Sun-like star is 0.55, due to reflection by the cloud decks. At such temperatures, a gas giant may glow red from thermal radiation but the reflected light generally overwhelms thermal radiation. For stars of visual apparent magnitude under 4.50, such planets are theoretically visible to our instruments. Sudarsky et al. listed 51 Pegasi b, Upsilon Andromedae b, HD 209458 b, and Tau Boötis b as possible Class V planets.

== See also ==
- Exoplanet
- List of planet types
