= Pollux b =

Candidate gas giant exoplanet orbiting Pollux

Pollux b / Thestias
Discovery
- Discovered by: Hatzes et al.
- Discovery site: United States
- Discovery date: 16 June 2006
- Detection method: Radial velocity

Designations
- Alternative names: β Geminorum b, HD 62509 b, Thestias

Orbital characteristics
- Semi-major axis: 1.64 ± 0.27 AU (245 ± 40 million km)
- Eccentricity: 0.02 ± 0.03
- Orbital period (sidereal): 589.64 ± 0.81 d 1.61432 ± 0.00222 y
- Time of periastron: 2,447,739.02 ± 4.5
- Semi-amplitude: 41.0 ± 1.6
- Star: Pollux

Physical characteristics
- Mass: ≥2.30±0.45 M_{J}

Pollux b, formally named Thestias /ˈθɛstiəs/, is an exoplanet candidate orbiting the star Pollux approximately 34 light-years away in the constellation of Gemini (the Twins). It is also designated β Geminorum b (Latinized to Beta Geminorum b, abbreviated β Gem b) or HD 62509 b. If this planet exists, it has a minimum mass of about twice the mass of Jupiter, and it moves around Pollux in 1.61 years at a distance of 1.64 AU in a nearly circular orbit. However, its existence has been disputed.

== History of observations ==
The discovery of Pollux b was announced in 2006 by astronomer Artie P. Hatzes and co-authors using the radial velocity method. A planet orbiting Pollux had previously been hypothesized by Hatzes in 1993, though at that time it was thought more likely that the radial velocity variations were caused by intrinsic stellar variability.

An independent study published shortly after the discovery paper supported the existence of Pollux b, but expressed some uncertainty, leaving a non-planetary explanation for the radial velocity variations a possibility. Another independent study in 2008 also supported the planet.

The planet's existence has been questioned by two subsequent studies, one in 2013 and its 2021 follow-up. A weak magnetic field in Pollux was detected in 2009, and it was suggested that magnetic variability in the star, as opposed to a planet, might be the cause of the observed radial velocity variations. The stellar rotation period was found to be close to the proposed period of Pollux b, casting some doubt on the planet's existence. The 2021 study monitored Pollux for 4.25 years and found the rotational period to be 660±15 d, close to Pollux b's orbital period of 590 days. Even though both values aren't equal, there might still be systematic errors in the rotational period.

== Naming ==
In July 2014 the International Astronomical Union launched NameExoWorlds, a process for giving proper names to certain exoplanets and their host stars. The process involved public nomination and voting for the new names. In December 2015, the IAU announced the winning name was Thestias for this planet. The winning name was based on that originally submitted by theSkyNet of Australia; namely Leda, Pollux's mother in Greek and Roman mythology. At the request of the IAU, 'Thestias' (the patronym of Leda, a daughter of Thestius) was substituted. This was because 'Leda' was already attributed to an asteroid and to one of Jupiter's satellites.

== See also ==
- Gemini in Chinese astronomy
- Cancer Minor (constellation) – Obsolete constellation inside modern Gemini
- Sudarsky's gas giant classification
