= Pollux (star) =

Star in the constellation Gemini

- Location of Pollux (circled)

Observation data Epoch J2000.0 Equinox ICRS
- Constellation: Gemini
- Pronunciation: /ˈpɒləks/
- Right ascension: 07^{h} 45^{m} 18.94987^{s}
- Declination: +28° 01′ 34.3160″
- Apparent magnitude (V): 1.14

Characteristics
- Evolutionary stage: Red-giant branch
- Spectral type: K0 III
- U−B color index: +0.86
- B−V color index: +1.00
- V−R color index: +0.75
- R−I color index: +0.50
- Variable type: Suspected

Astrometry
| Radial velocity (R_{v}) | +3.23 km/s |
| Proper motion (μ) | RA: −626.55 mas/yr Dec.: −45.80 mas/yr |
| Parallax (π) | 96.54±0.27 mas |
| Distance | 33.78 ± 0.09 ly (10.36 ± 0.03 pc) |
| Absolute magnitude (M_{V}) | +1.08±0.02 |

Details
| Mass | 2.12±0.09 M_{☉} |
| Radius | 8.97±0.03 R_{☉} |
| Luminosity | 38.4±0.3 L_{☉} |
| Surface gravity (log g) | 2.55±0.03 cgs |
| Temperature | 4,810±14 K |
| Metallicity [Fe/H] | –0.07 to +0.19 dex |
| Rotation | 660±15 d |
| Rotational velocity (v sin i) | 2.8 km/s |
| Age | 1.19±0.3 (0.9 – 1.7) Gyr |

Other designations
- β Geminorum, 78 Geminorum, BD+28°1463, GJ 286, HD 62509, HIP 37826, HR 2990, SAO 79666, LFT 548, LHS 1945, LTT 12065

Database references
| SIMBAD | data |
| Exoplanet Archive | data |
| ARICNS | data |

Pollux is the brightest star in the constellation of Gemini. It has the Bayer designation β Geminorum, which is Latinised to Beta Geminorum and abbreviated Beta Gem or β Gem. This is an orange-hued red giant located at a distance of 34 light-years, making it the closest red giant (and giant star) to the Sun. Since 1943, the spectrum of this star has served as one of the stable anchor points by which other stars are classified. In 2006, an exoplanet (designated Pollux b or β Geminorum b, later named Thestias) was announced to be orbiting it.

== Nomenclature ==
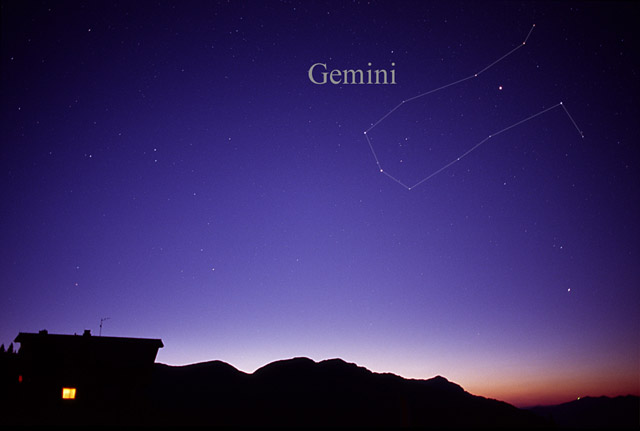
Pollux is one of the two brightest stars in the constellation of Gemini (lower left).

β Geminorum (Latinised to Beta Geminorum) is the star's Bayer designation.

The traditional name Pollux refers to the twins Castor and Pollux in Greek and Roman mythology. In 2016, the International Astronomical Union organized a Working Group on Star Names (WGSN) to catalog and standardize proper names for stars. The WGSN's first bulletin of July 2016 included a table of the first two batches of names approved by the WGSN, which included Pollux for this star.

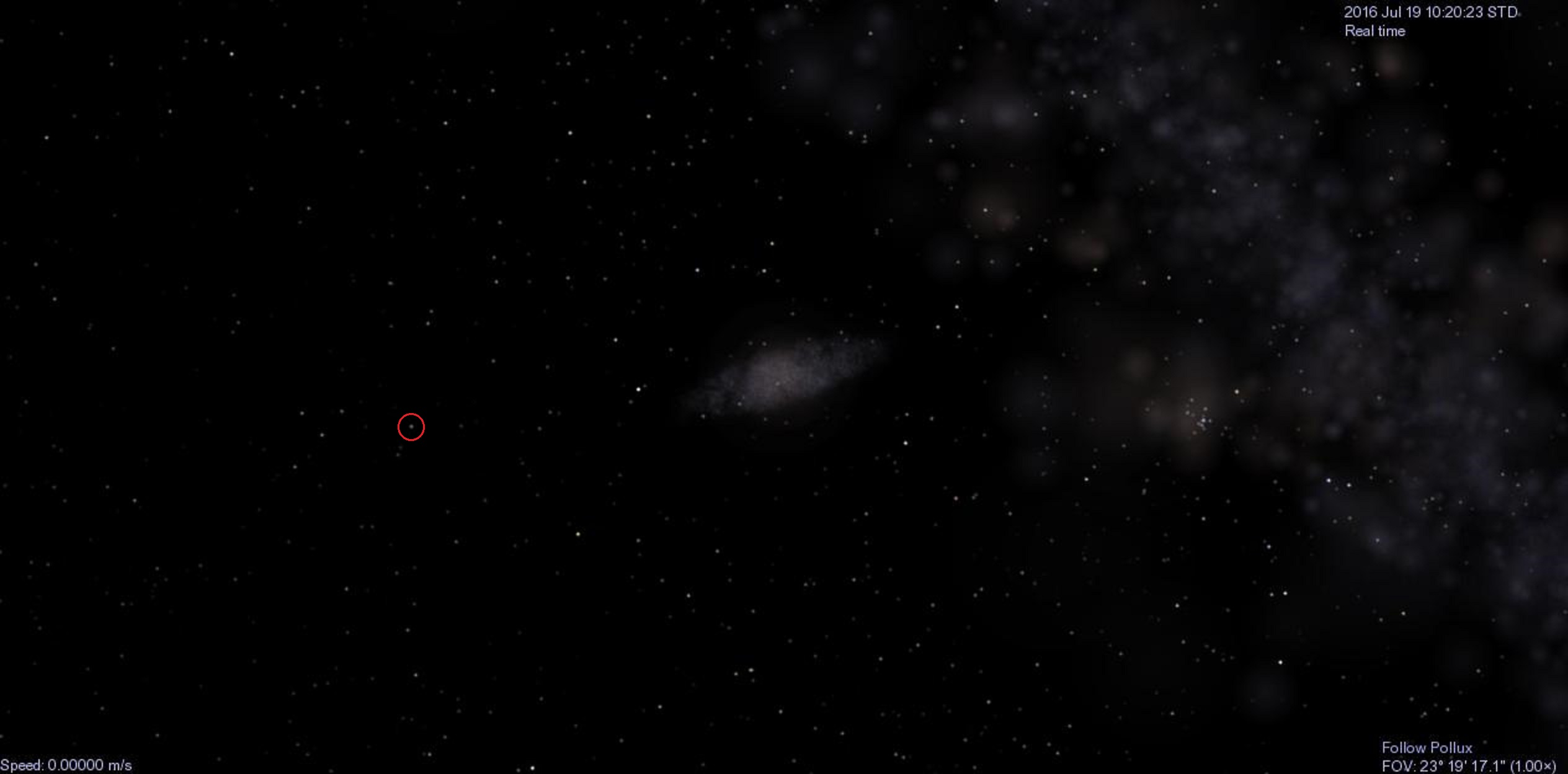
The Sun viewed from Pollux (in red circle) in the constellation Sagittarius. Made with Celestia

Castor and Pollux are the two "heavenly twin" stars giving the constellation Gemini (Latin, 'the twins') its name. The stars, however, are quite different in detail. Castor is a complex sextuple system of hot, bluish-white type A stars and dim red dwarfs, while Pollux is a single, cooler yellow-orange giant. In Percy Shelley's 1818 poem Homer's Hymn to Castor and Pollux, the star is referred to as "... mild Pollux, void of blame."

Originally the planet was designated Pollux b. In July 2014 the International Astronomical Union launched NameExoWorlds, a process for giving proper names to certain exoplanets and their host stars. The process involved public nomination and voting for the new names. In December 2015, the IAU announced the winning name was Thestias for this planet. The winning name was based on that originally submitted by theSkyNet of Australia; namely Leda, Pollux's mother. At the request of the IAU, 'Thestias' (the patronym of Leda, a daughter of Thestius) was substituted. This was because 'Leda' was already attributed to an asteroid and to one of Jupiter's satellites.

In the catalogue of stars in the Calendarium of al Achsasi al Mouakket, this star was designated Muekher al Dzira, which was translated into Latin as Posterior Brachii, meaning the end in the paw.

In Chinese, 北河 (Běi Hé), meaning North River, refers to an asterism consisting of Pollux, ρ Geminorum, and Castor. Consequently, Pollux itself is known as 北河三 (Běi Hé sān, English: the Third Star of North River.)

== Physical characteristics ==
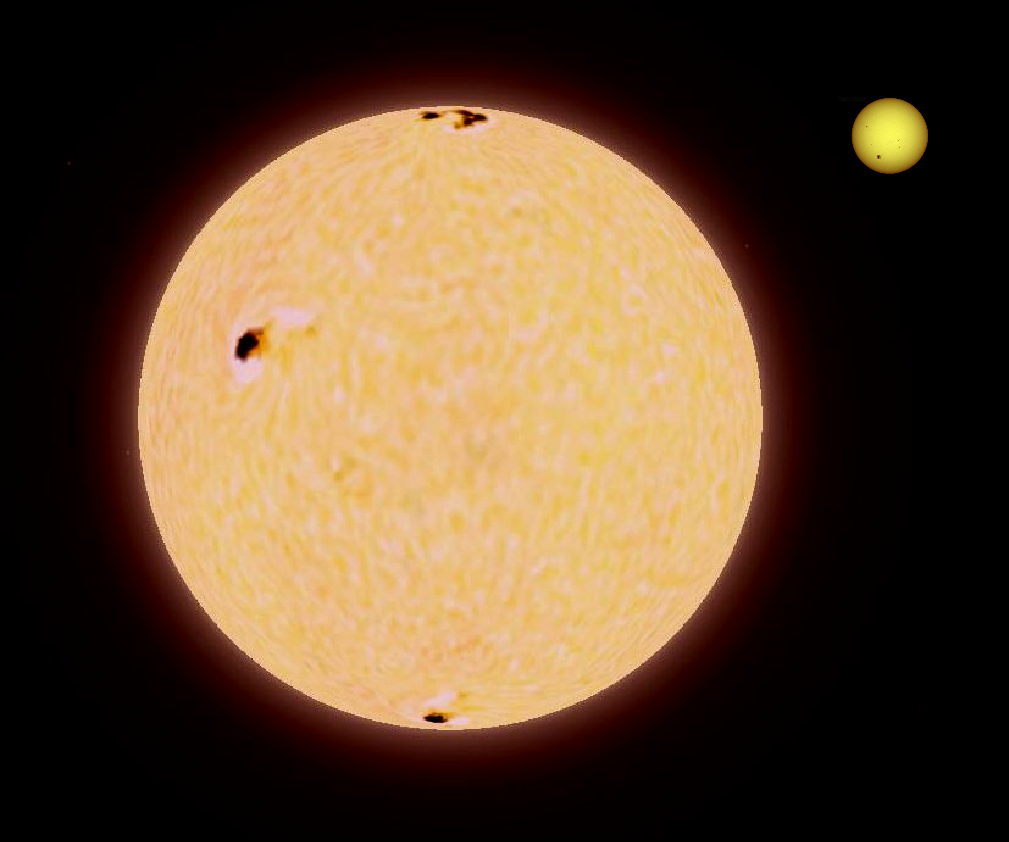
Size comparison of Pollux (left) and the Sun (right)

At an apparent visual magnitude of 1.14, Pollux is the brightest star in its constellation, even brighter than its neighbor Castor (α Geminorum). Pollux is 6.7 degrees north of the ecliptic, presently too far north to be occulted by the Moon. The last lunar occultation visible from Earth was on 30 September 117 BCE from high southern latitudes.

Parallax measurements by the Hipparcos astrometry satellite place Pollux at a distance of about 33.78 light-years (10.36 parsecs) from the Sun. This is close to the standard unit for determining a star's absolute magnitude (a star's apparent magnitude as viewed from 10 parsecs). Hence, Pollux's apparent and absolute magnitudes are quite close.

The star is larger than the Sun, with about two times its mass and almost nine times its radius. Once an A-type main-sequence star similar to Sirius, Pollux has exhausted the hydrogen at its core and evolved into a giant star with a stellar classification of K0 III. The effective temperature of this star's outer envelope is about 4,810 K, which lies in the range that produces the characteristic orange hue of K-type stars. Pollux has a projected rotational velocity of 2.8 km·s^{−1}. The abundance of elements other than hydrogen and helium, what astronomers term the star's metallicity, is uncertain, with estimates ranging from 85% to 155% of the Sun's abundance.

An old estimate for Pollux's diameter obtained in 1925 by John Stanley Plaskett via interferometry was 13 million miles (20.9 million km, or 18.5 R_{☉}), significantly larger than modern estimates. A more recent measurement by the Navy Precision Optical Interferometer give a radius of 8.97 R_{☉}. Another estimate that uses Pollux's spectral lines obtained 8.9 R_{☉}.

Evidence for a low level of magnetic activity came from the detection of weak X-ray emission using the ROSAT orbiting telescope. The X-ray emission from this star is about 10^{27} erg s^{−1}, which is roughly the same as the X-ray emission from the Sun. A magnetic field with a strength below 1 gauss has since been confirmed on the surface of Pollux; one of the weakest fields ever detected on a star. The presence of this field suggests that Pollux was once an Ap star with a much stronger magnetic field. The star displays small amplitude radial velocity variations, but is not photometrically variable.

== Planetary system ==
Since 1993 scientists have suspected an exoplanet orbiting Pollux, from measured radial velocity oscillations. The existence of the planet, Pollux b, was confirmed and announced on June 16, 2006. Pollux b is calculated to have a mass at least 2.3 times that of Jupiter. The planet is orbiting Pollux with a period of about 590 days.

The existence of Pollux b has been disputed; the possibility that the observed radial velocity variations are caused by stellar magnetic activity cannot be ruled out.

The Pollux planetary system
| Companion (in order from star) | Mass | Semimajor axis (AU) | Orbital period (days) | Eccentricity | Inclination (°) | Radius |
|---|---|---|---|---|---|---|
| b (Thestias) (disputed) | > 2.30±0.45 M_{J} | 1.64±0.27 | 589.64±0.81 | 0.02±0.03 | — | — |
