= Majriti =

Majriti may refer to:

- Maslama al-Majriti, a 10th century astronomer in Islamic Spain
- Majriti (planet), a planet also designated Upsilon Andromedae d
