= Upsilon Andromedae b =

Extrasolar planet in the Andromeda constellation

Upsilon Andromedae b / Saffar
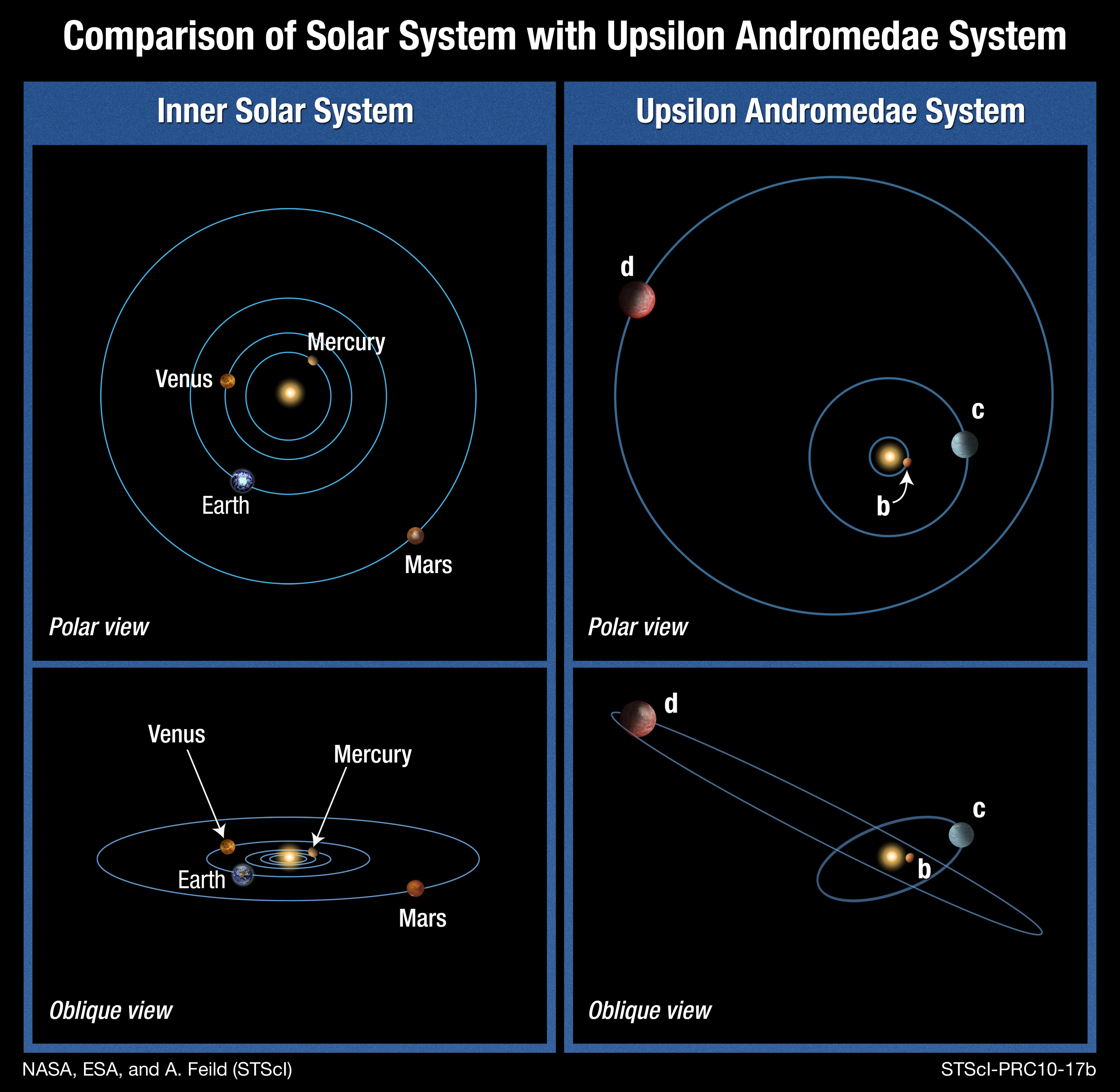
- Comparison of the orbits of Upsilon Andromedae b, c and d, with those of the inner Solar System.

Discovery
- Discovered by: Marcy et al.
- Discovery site: California and Carnegie; Planet Search; United States
- Discovery date: June 23, 1996
- Detection method: Radial velocity

Orbital characteristics
- Apastron: 0.0601 AU
- Periastron: 0.0587 AU
- Semi-major axis: 0.0594±0.0003 AU
- Eccentricity: 0.012±0.005
- Orbital period (sidereal): 4.617111±0.000014 d (0.01264096 a; 110.8107 h)
- Inclination: 14.27
- Time of periastron: 2,450,034.05±0.33
- Argument of periastron: 44.11±25.56
- Semi-amplitude: 70.51±0.37
- Star: Upsilon Andromedae A

Physical characteristics
- Mean radius: ~1.8 R_{J}
- Mass: 2.81 M_{J}
- Temperature: 1,670–1,920 K (1,400–1,650 °C) (dayside); 253–503 K (−20–230 °C) (nightside)

Upsilon Andromedae b (υ Andromedae b, abbreviated Upsilon And b, υ And b), formally named Saffar /ˈsæfɑːr/, is an extrasolar planet approximately 44 light-years away from the Sun in the constellation of Andromeda. The planet orbits its host star, the F-type main-sequence star Upsilon Andromedae A, approximately every five days. Discovered in June 1996 by Geoffrey Marcy and R. Paul Butler, it was one of the first hot Jupiters to be discovered. It is also one of the first non-resolved planets to be detected directly. Upsilon Andromedae b is the innermost-known planet in its planetary system.

In July 2014 the International Astronomical Union launched NameExoWorlds, a process for giving proper names to certain exoplanets and their host stars. The process involved public nomination and voting for the new names. In December 2015, the IAU announced the winning name was Saffar for this planet. The winning name was submitted by the Vega Astronomy Club of Morocco and honours the 11th-century astronomer Ibn al-Saffar of Muslim Spain.

== Discovery ==
Upsilon Andromedae b was detected by the variations in its star's radial velocity caused by the planet's gravity. The variations were detected by making sensitive measurements of the Doppler shift of Upsilon Andromedae's spectrum. The planet's existence was announced in January 1997, together with 55 Cancri b and the planet orbiting Tau Boötis.

Like 51 Pegasi b, the first extrasolar planet discovered around a normal star, Upsilon Andromedae b orbits very close to its star, closer than Mercury does to the Sun. The planet takes 4.617 days to complete an orbit, with a semimajor axis of 0.0595 AU.

== Physical characteristics ==
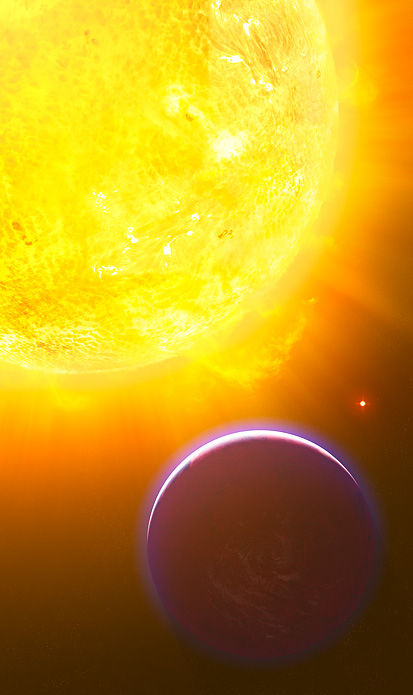
An artist's impression of Upsilon Andromedae b and its parent star

A limitation of the radial velocity method used to detect Upsilon Andromedae b is that only a lower limit on the mass can be found. The true mass may be much greater depending on the inclination of the orbit. Based on an analysis of the dynamic stability of the planetary system and the preference for prograde orbital solutions, the planet's inclination should be in the range of 5–23°, resulting in a true mass of 1.78–8.02 M_{J}. Among these solutions, a value of 14° is preferred based on considerations of the implied planetary radius, consistency with published orbital elements and preference for prograde orbits, resulting in a true mass of 2.81 M_{J}. A mass of 1.70 M_{J} and an inclination of 24° were later found using high-resolution spectroscopy, but these results have since found to be doubtful given that the planet should not have been detected with current data. Given the planet's high mass, should be a gas giant with no solid surface.

Observations by the Spitzer Space Telescope published in 2006 showed that the observed light of the system varied in phase with the orbital motion of the planet, meaning that some of the light coming from the system originates from the planet. These observations measured the planet's temperature, and found that the difference between the two sides of Upsilon Andromedae b is about 1,400 degrees Celsius, ranging from minus 20 to 230 degrees to about 1,400 to 1,650 °C. This helped confirming that hot Jupiters have distinct temperatures on the dayside (always faced to the host star) and the nightside (always facing away). The measured phase curve of the planet together with measurements of the orbital inclination allows an estimate of its radius, which as of 2014 is thought to be 1.8 Jupiter radii (R_{J}) based on the likely inclination values, making it one of the largest known exoplanets.

David Sudarsky had, on the assumption that the planet is similar to Jupiter in composition and that its environment is close to chemical equilibrium, predicted Upsilon Andromedae b to have reflective clouds of silicates and iron in its upper atmosphere. The cloud deck instead absorbs the star's radiation; between that and the hot, high-pressure gas surrounding the mantle, exists a stratosphere of cooler gas. The outer shell of dark, opaque, hot cloud is assumed to consist of vanadium and titanium oxides, but other compounds like tholins cannot be ruled out yet.

The chemical elements in the atmosphere can be studied by finding their absorption lines in the thermal spectrum of the planet; given typical planet temperatures, the spectrum has its peak at infrared wavelengths. So far, only water vapor has been detected in this planet, while carbon monoxide and methane are still under the detection limit.

The planet is unlikely to have large moons, since tidal forces would either eject them from orbit or destroy them on short timescales compared to the age of the system.

The planet (with 51 Pegasi b) was deemed a candidate for direct imaging by Planetpol. In 2016–2017 the direct detection of the planetary thermal emission was claimed, but the detection was questioned in 2021. Similarly, the planet was not detected using high-resolution inferterometric observations by the CHARA array.

== Host star ==
The planet orbits a (F-type) star named Titawin (Upsilon Andromedae A). The star has a mass of 1.27 M_{☉} and a radius of around 1.48 R_{☉}. It has a temperature of 6,074 K and is 3.12 billion years old. In comparison, the Sun is about 4.6 billion years old. The star is slightly metal-rich, with a metallicity ([Fe/H]) of 0.09, or about 123% of the solar amount. Its luminosity (L_{☉}) is 3.57 times that of the Sun.

The star's apparent magnitude, or how bright it appears from Earth's perspective, is 4.09. Therefore, Upsilon Andromedae can be seen with the naked eye.

=== Effect on the parent star ===
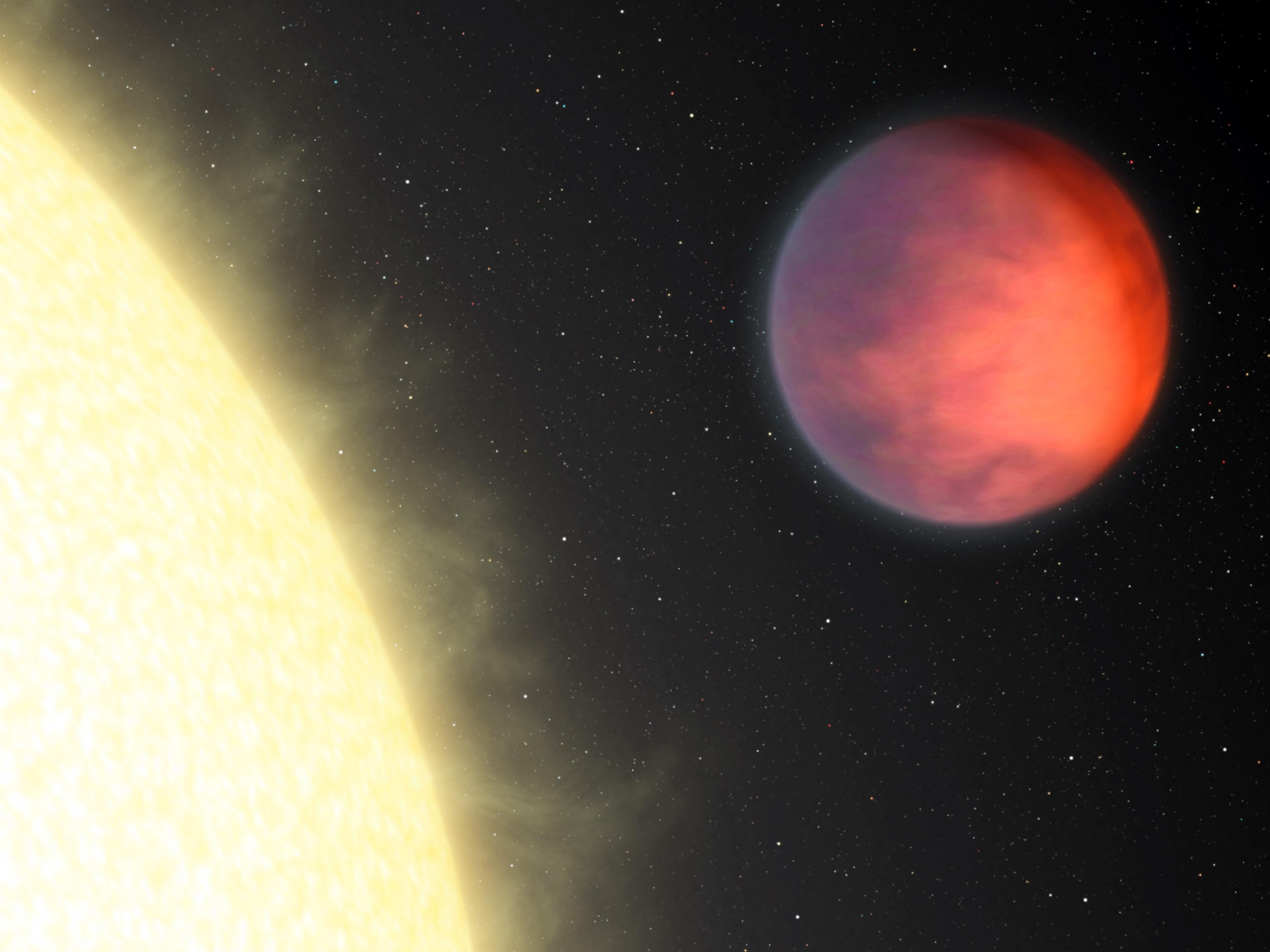
Artist's impression of the hot spot, shown in orange hues

Upsilon Andromedae b appears to be responsible for increased chromospheric activity on its parent star. Observations suggest that there is a "hot spot" on the star around 169 degrees away from the sub-planetary point. This may be the result of interactions between the magnetic fields of the planet and the star. The mechanism may be similar to that responsible for the activity of RS Canum Venaticorum variable stars, or the interaction between Jupiter and its moon Io.

== See also ==
- 55 Cancri b
- Tau Boötis b
- List of exoplanets discovered before 2000
