= Artie P. Hatzes =

American astronomer (born 1957)

- Born: May 24, 1957 (age 69); Havre de Grace, Maryland
- Education: California Institute of Technology; University of California, Santa Cruz
- Known for: Discovering numerous extrasolar planets
- Scientific career
- Fields: Astronomy
- Workplaces: Karl Schwarzschild Observatory

Artie P. Hatzes (born May 24, 1957 in Havre de Grace, Maryland) is an American astronomer. He was a professor at the Friedrich Schiller University of Jena and director of the Karl Schwarzschild Observatory (Thuringian State Observatory) from 2000 to 2023.

Hatzes is a pioneer in the search of extrasolar planets and is working on the CoRoT space mission. His achievements have included discovering the extrasolar planets Pollux b, Epsilon Eridani b and HD 13189 companion.
