= Ibn al-Samh =

Arab mathematician and astronomer

Abū al‐Qāsim Aṣbagh ibn Muḥammad ibn al‐Samḥ al‐Gharnāṭī al-Mahri (Arabic: أصبغ المهري) (born 979, Córdoba; died 1035, Granada), also known as Ibn al‐Samḥ, was an Arab mathematician and astronomer from Al-Andalus. He worked at the school founded by Al-Majriti in Córdoba, until political unrest forced him to move to Granada, where he was employed by Ḥabbūs ibn Māksan. He is known for treatises on the construction and use of the astrolabe, as well as the first known work on the planetary equatorium. Furthermore, in mathematics he is remembered for a commentary on Euclid and for contributions to early algebra, among other works. He is one of several writers referred to in Latin texts as "Abulcasim."

The exoplanet Samh, also known as Upsilon Andromedae c, is named in his honor as part of the IAU's NameExoWorlds project.
