= Upsilon Andromedae c =

Extrasolar planet in the constellation Andromeda

Upsilon Andromedae c / Samh
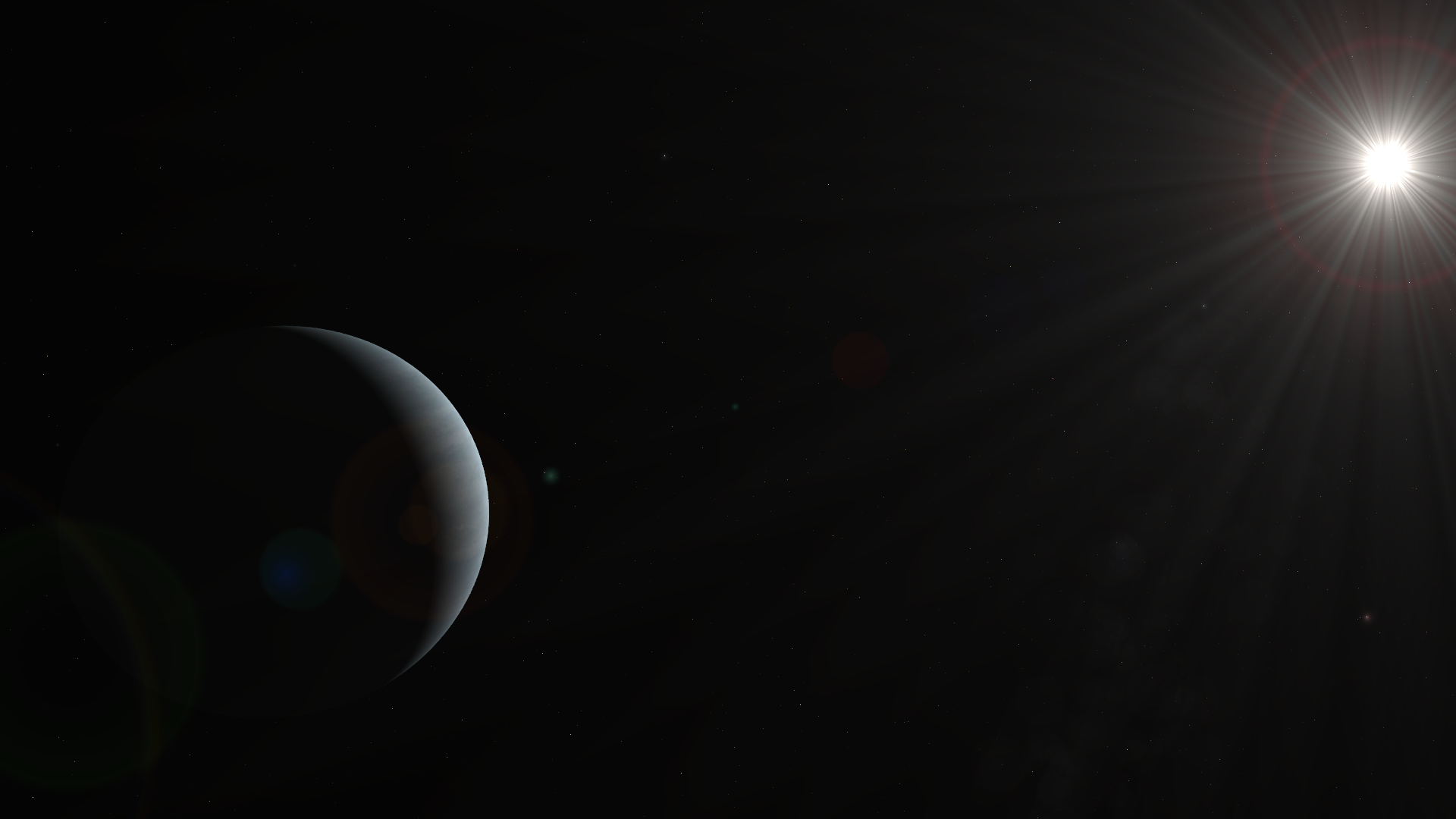
- An artist's impression of Upsilon Andromedae c.

Discovery
- Discovered by: Marcy et al.
- Discovery site: California and Carnegie; Planet Search; USA
- Discovery date: April 15, 1999
- Detection method: Radial velocity

Orbital characteristics
- Apastron: ~9.11 Gm
- Periastron: ~91.6 Gm
- Semi-major axis: ~124.1 Gm
- Eccentricity: 0.260 ± 0.079
- Orbital period (sidereal): 241.26 ± 0.64 d ~0.66228 y
- Inclination: 7.868 ± 1.003
- Longitude of ascending node: 236.853 ± 7.528
- Time of periastron: 2,499,922.53 ± 1.17
- Argument of periastron: 247.66 ± 1.76
- Semi-amplitude: 56.26 ± 0.52
- Star: Upsilon Andromedae A

Physical characteristics
- Mass: 13.98+2.3 −5.3 M_{J}

Upsilon Andromedae c (υ Andromedae c, abbreviated Upsilon And c, υ And c), formally named Samh /ˈsɑːm/ (a homophone with the star Salm), is an extrasolar planet orbiting the Sun-like star Upsilon Andromedae A every 241.3 days at an average distance of 0.83 AU (124 million km; 77 million mi). Its discovery in April 1999 by Geoffrey Marcy and R. Paul Butler made this the first multiple-planet system to be discovered around a main-sequence star, and the first multiple-planet system known in a multiple star system. Upsilon Andromedae c is the second-known planet in order of distance from its star.

== Name ==
In July 2014 the International Astronomical Union launched NameExoWorlds, a process for giving proper names to certain exoplanets and their host stars. The process involved public nomination and voting for the new names. In December 2015, the IAU announced the winning name was Samh for this planet. The winning name was submitted by the Vega Astronomy Club of Morocco and honours the 11th-century astronomer Ibn al-Samh of Muslim Spain.

== Discovery ==
Upsilon Andromedae c was detected by measuring variations in its star's radial velocity as a result of the planet's gravity. This was done by making precise measurements of the Doppler shift of the spectrum of Upsilon Andromedae A. At the time of discovery, Upsilon Andromedae A was already known to host one extrasolar planet, the hot Jupiter Upsilon Andromedae b; however, by 1999 it was clear that the inner planet could not explain the velocity curve.

In 1999, astronomers at both San Francisco State University and the Harvard-Smithsonian Center for Astrophysics independently concluded that a three-planet model best fit the data. The two new planets were designated Upsilon Andromedae c and Upsilon Andromedae d.

== Host star ==
The planet orbits a (F-type) star named Upsilon Andromedae A. The star has a mass of 1.27 M_{☉} and a radius of around 1.48 R_{☉}. It has a temperature of 6,074 K and is 3.12 billion years old. In comparison, the Sun is about 4.6 billion years old. The star is slightly metal-rich, with a metallicity ([Fe/H]) of 0.09, or about 123% of the solar amount. Its luminosity (L_{☉}) is 3.57 times that of the Sun.

The star's apparent magnitude, or how bright it appears from Earth's perspective, is 4.09. Therefore, Upsilon Andromedae can be seen with the naked eye.

== Orbit and mass ==
Like the majority of long-period extrasolar planets, the orbit of Upsilon Andromedae c is eccentric, more so than any of the major planets in the Solar System (including Pluto). If placed in the Solar System, Upsilon Andromedae c would lie between the orbits of Earth and Venus.

The high orbital eccentricity may be the result of gravitational perturbations from the planet Upsilon Andromedae d. Simulations suggest that the orbit of Upsilon Andromedae c returns to its original circular state roughly once every 9,000 years.

One proposal is that interactions between Upsilon Andromedae d and a (now lost) outer planet moved Upsilon Andromedae d into an orbit closer to the star, where it gradually caused the orbit of Upsilon Andromedae c to become eccentric. If so, the rogue planet would have had to eject immediately.

A limitation of the radial velocity method used to detect Upsilon Andromedae c is that the orbital inclination is unknown, and only a lower limit on the planet's mass can be obtained. Because the planet's orbit is inclined by only about 8 degrees from the celestial sphere, the radial velocity signal is comparatively weak, and c was consequently thought at first to have a mass closer to only 2 Jupiter masses. However, subsequently astrometry was used to ascertain the planet's true mass; by combining radial velocity measurements from ground-based telescopes with astrometric data from the Hubble Space Telescope, astronomers have determined the orbital inclination as well as the actual mass of Upsilon Andromedae c, which is about 13.98 times the mass of Jupiter. The mutual inclination between c and d is 29.9 degrees.

== Characteristics ==
Given the planet's high mass, it is likely that Upsilon Andromedae c is a gas giant with no solid surface. Since the planet has only been detected indirectly through observations of its star, properties such as its radius, composition, and temperature are unknown.

Since its actual mass is approximately 14 times that of Jupiter, and its star's metallicity is similar to that of the Sun, Upsilon Andromedae c may actually be a small brown dwarf, but this may not be the case. Deuterium burning, which by some criteria defines brown dwarf status, can occur in bodies larger than about 13 Jupiter masses, and it may or may not be occurring in planet c.

== See also ==
- Eccentric Jupiter
- List of exoplanets discovered before 2000
