= David Sudarsky =

American astrophysicist

David Sudarsky is an astrophysicist at the University of Arizona. He is primarily known for producing the first exoplanet classification system, which is based on a series of theoretical gas-giant-atmosphere models. By modeling the physical characteristics and chemistry of their atmospheres, the appearance of gas giants is predicted.

He has published numerous papers listed in arXiv.
