= Epsilon Eridani b =

Gas giant orbiting Epsilon Eridani

Epsilon Eridani b / AEgir
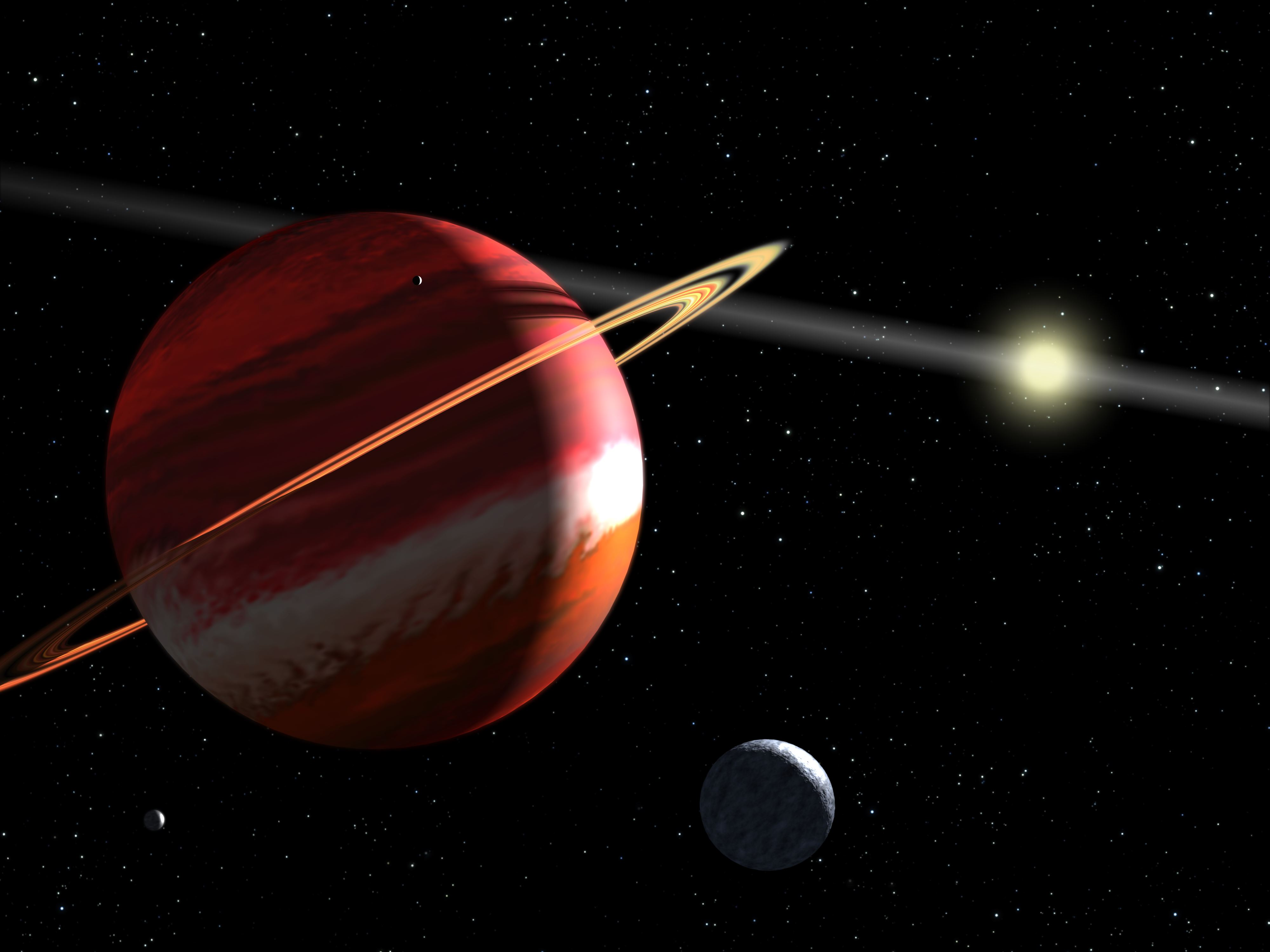
- An artist's impression of Epsilon Eridani b, depicting it as a gas giant with rings. The object near the bottom is a hypothetical moon.

Discovery
- Discovered by: Hatzes et al.
- Discovery site: United States
- Discovery date: 7 August 2000
- Detection method: Doppler spectroscopy

Orbital characteristics
- Semi-major axis: 3.52±0.03 AU
- Eccentricity: 0.04+0.04 −0.03
- Orbital period (sidereal): 7.287+0.057 −0.051 yr
- Inclination: 43°±4°
- Longitude of ascending node: −165°+4° −5°
- Time of periastron: 2457907+306 −792 JD
- Argument of periastron: 302°+42° −249°
- Semi-amplitude: 10.6 m/s
- Star: Epsilon Eridani

Physical characteristics
- Mean radius: 0.85+0.09 −0.11 – 0.970+0.009 −0.022 R_{J}
- Mass: 0.91±0.04 M_{J}
- Surface gravity: 10^{3.41+0.05 −0.04} – 10^{3.50+0.13 −0.04} cgs
- Temperature: 163+12 −6 – 189+14 −16 K (−110 to −84 °C; −166 to −119 °F)

Epsilon Eridani b, formally named AEgir [sic], is an exoplanet approximately 10.5 light-years away orbiting the star Epsilon Eridani, in the constellation of Eridanus (the River). The planet was discovered in 2000, and as of 2025 remains the only confirmed planet in its planetary system. It is a remarkably close analog to Jupiter, with similar mass and orbit.

== Name ==
The planet and its host star are one of the planetary systems selected by the International Astronomical Union as part of NameExoWorlds, their public process for giving proper names to exoplanets and their host star (where no proper name already exists). The process involved public nomination and voting for the new names. In December 2015, the IAU announced the winning names were AEgir for the planet (pronounced /ˈiːdʒər/ [Anglicized] or /ˈeɪjɪər/, an approximation of the old Norse Ægir) and Ran for the star. James Ott, age 14, submitted the names for the IAU contest and won.

The moon Aegir of Saturn is also named after the mythological Ægir, and differs in spelling only by capitalization.

== Characteristics ==
=== Orbit ===
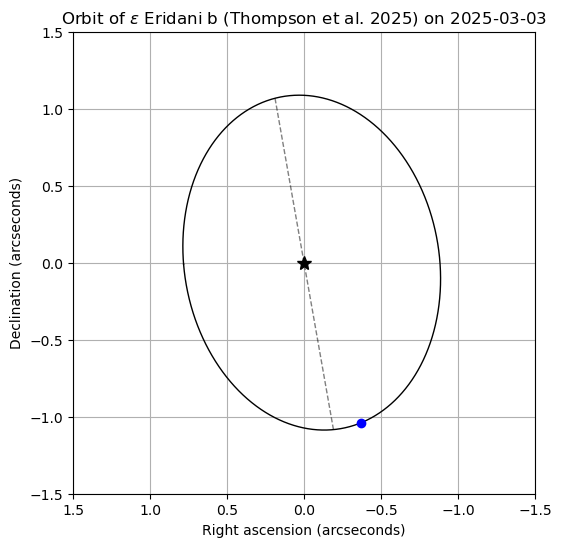
Orbit of Epsilon Eridani b as seen from the Solar System

The semi-major axis of Epsilon Eridani b's orbit is 3.52 AU, and the planet completes an orbit around its star every 7.29 years. The orbit is nearly circular, having a low eccentricity of 0.04+0.04
−0.03, comparable to Jupiter's eccentricity of approximately 0.05.

Viewed from the Solar System, Epsilon Eridani b's orbit is inclined from face-on orientation by 43°. The planet's orbital plane is found to be close to coplanar with the main belt, with mutual inclination of 14°±4°.

=== Physical properties ===
Epsilon Eridani b's true mass is 0.91 Jupiter masses. The inclination of its orbit caused the minimum mass measured by the radial velocity method to be 0.63 Jupiter masses. It is slightly smaller than Jupiter, with estimates ranging between 0.85+0.09
−0.11 and 0.970+0.009
−0.022 Jupiter radii. Estimates of its temperature range from 163 to 189 K (−110 to −84 °C; −166 to −119 °F).

== History of observations ==
=== Discovery ===
The existence of a planet around Epsilon Eridani was suspected by a Canadian team led by Bruce Campbell and Gordon Walker since 1988, but their observations were not definitive enough to make a solid discovery.

Its formal discovery was announced on 7 August 2000, by a team led by Artie Hatzes. The discoverers gave its minimum mass as 0.86 Jupiter masses, with a semi-major axis of 3.3 AU and eccentricity of 0.6. Observers, including Geoffrey Marcy, suggested that more information on the star's Doppler noise behaviour created by its large and varying magnetic field was needed before the planet could be confirmed.

The planet continued to be detected in subsequent observations over the following years. In 2006, utilizing new radial velocity data, a team of researchers found the planet to reside in a more circular orbit, with an eccentricity of 0.25, as well as finding a minimum mass of 1.06 Jupiter masses and a semi-major axis of 3.38 AU. Later that year, astrometric measurements made by the Hubble Space Telescope showed that the planet's orbit shares the same plane as the outer dust disk observed around the star, and is highly eccentric, at an eccentricity of 0.702, while its mass was found to be 1.55 Jupiter masses.

=== Planet challenged ===
In 2009, the Spitzer Space Telescope detected an inner warm belt located at roughly 3 AU from the star. A team of astronomers found that the high eccentricity of the planet and this belt were inconsistent, as the planet would pass through the belt and rapidly clear it of material, although they may be reconciled if the true eccentricity of the planet was lower, or if the belt's material had migrated in from the outer comet belt (also known to exist).

The existence of the planet itself came into doubt when two papers published in 2012 and 2013 failed to recover the planet previously found in the radial velocity data, suggesting that the signal may, in fact, be stellar activity of the parent star instead, or at least the planet has very different properties from what previous papers reported. The nondetection of Epsilon Eridani b was not unanimous, however, as a paper from 2016 found the stellar activity to be uncorrelated to the planetary signal previously claimed, strengthening the case for a planet.

A paper published in January 2019 successfully detected Epsilon Eridani b, and found an orbital eccentricity of around 0.07, much smaller than previous estimate and consistent with a nearly circular orbit. This resolved the stability issue with the inner asteroid belt. The updated measurements also included new estimate for the mass of the planet, at 0.78 Jupiter masses, but the poorly constrained inclination of 89°±42° meant this was only a rough estimate of the absolute mass. If the planet instead orbited at the same inclination as the debris disc (34°), as supported by Benedict et al. 2006, then its mass would have been greater, at approximately 1.19 Jupiter masses.

The existence of the planet was further corroborated by astrometric observations.

=== Inconsistent orbital solutions ===
Since 2019, several papers have characterized the planet's orbit and mass using radial velocity data, often in conjunction with astrometric data, and upper limits from non-detection via direct imaging. These papers found different and inconsistent orbital solutions, owing to different datasets and methodologies, with the planet's true mass values ranging from 0.6 to 0.8 Jupiter masses, eccentricities ranging from nearly circular orbit to significantly eccentric, and inclinations between 45° and 78°.

=== Direct imaging ===
Multiple direct imaging efforts of this planet have been unsuccessfully conducted in the past, serving to place upper limits on its brightness.

The results of the earliest James Webb Space Telescope (JWST) observations on Epsilon Eridani, published in 2025, yielded no statistically significant detections. While a source was detected that has a position and brightness consistent with the expected for Epsilon Eridani b, it did not reach sufficient statistical significance and may be noise from raw data reduction.

The results of a subsequent JWST program, published in 2026, also failed to detect the planet. The non-detection may be explained by a metal-enriched atmosphere and/or an atmosphere containing water clouds, both suggesting that Epsilon Eridani b's atmosphere may be similar to Jupiter's. A further 2026 study concluded that the non-detection suggests an atmosphere composed of water clouds and in chemical disequilibrium, or alternatively, a clear atmosphere highly enriched in metals. If such a high metallicity is deemed unlikely, then the cloudy atmosphere becomes the favored explanation. Future imaging observations are needed; if the planet is not detected up to a contrast of 2×10^{−9}, all clear atmospheres at any metallicity would be ruled out.

Another JWST program observed Epsilon Eridani between December 2024 and February 2025, when the angular separation between the star and the planet was expected to be at its maximum, in order to acquire a direct image of the planet, as well as its spectrum. As of March 2026, the results of these observations have yet to be published.

== See also ==
- Epsilon Indi Ab, another nearby exoplanet and direct imaging target
- Gliese 832 b, another nearby Jupiter-like exoplanet
- List of nearest exoplanets
- 14 Herculis c, another direct imaging target
- HIP 11915 b, another Jupiter analog exoplanet
