= Upsilon Andromedae d =

Extrasolar planet in the Andromeda constellation

Upsilon Andromedae d / Majriti
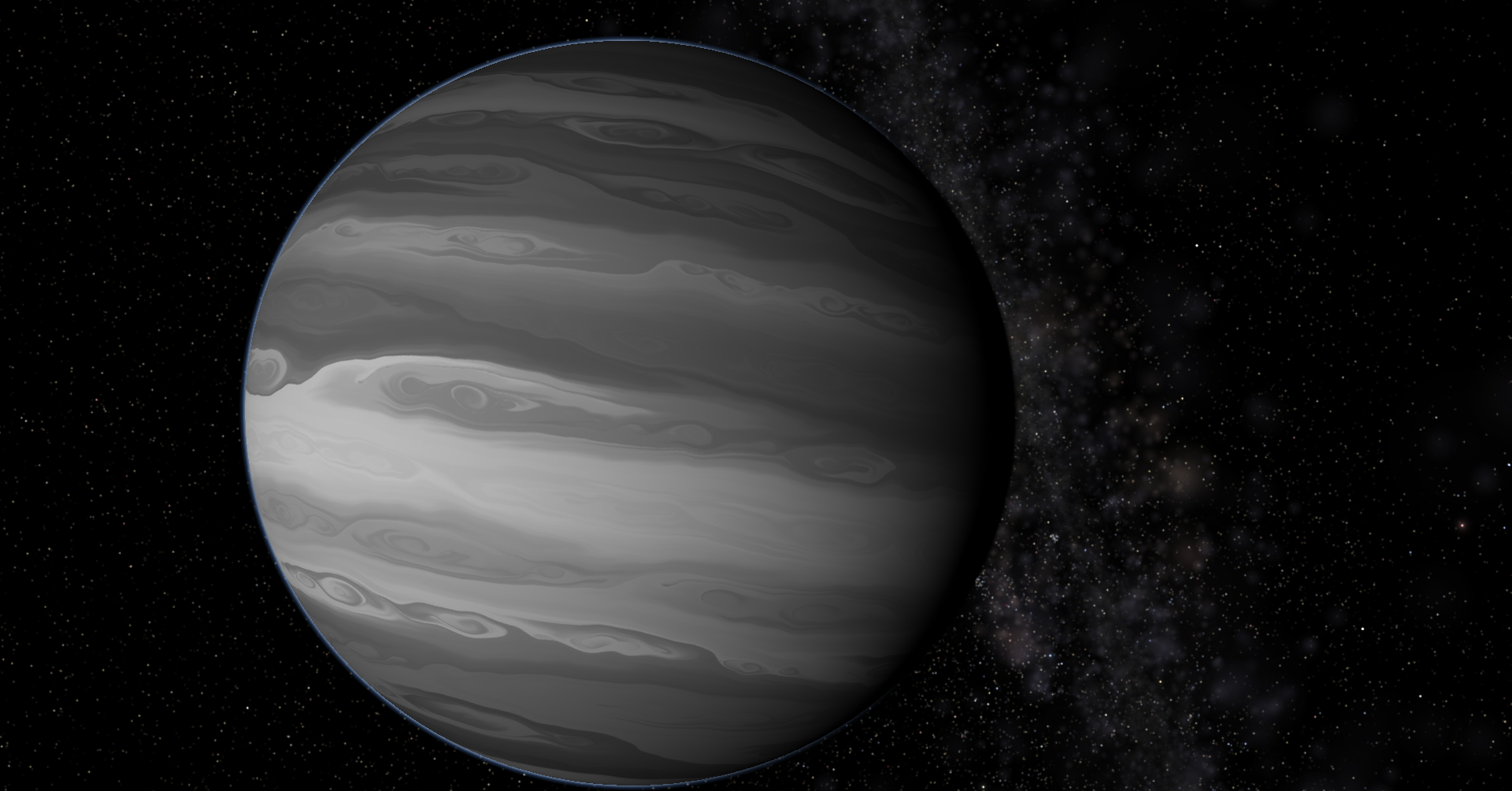
- An artist's impression of Upsilon And d

Discovery
- Discovered by: Butler, Marcy et al.
- Discovery site: California and Carnegie; Planet Search; USA
- Discovery date: April 15, 1999
- Detection method: Radial velocity

Orbital characteristics
- Apastron: ~478 Gm
- Periastron: ~282 Gm
- Semi-major axis: ~380 Gm
- Eccentricity: 0.299 ± 0.072
- Orbital period (sidereal): 1,276.46 ± 0.57d ~3.49626 y
- Inclination: 23.758 ± 1.316
- Longitude of ascending node: 4.073 ± 3.301
- Time of periastron: 2,450,059 ± 3.495
- Argument of periastron: 252.991 ± 1.311
- Semi-amplitude: 68.14 ± 0.45
- Star: Upsilon Andromedae A

Physical characteristics
- Mean radius: ~1.02 R_{J}
- Mass: 10.25+0.7 −3.3 M_{J}
- Temperature: 218 K (−55 °C; −67 °F)

Upsilon Andromedae d (υ Andromedae d, abbreviated Upsilon And d, υ And d), formally named Majriti /mædʒˈraɪti/, is a super-Jupiter exoplanet orbiting within the habitable zone of the Sun-like star Upsilon Andromedae A, approximately 44 light-years (13.5 parsecs, or nearly 416.3 trillion km) away from Earth in the constellation of Andromeda. Its discovery made it the first multiplanetary system to be discovered around a main-sequence star, and the first such system known in a multiple star system. The exoplanet was found by using the radial velocity method, where periodic Doppler shifts of spectral lines of the host star suggest an orbiting object.

== Name ==
In July 2014 the International Astronomical Union (IAU) launched NameExoWorlds, a process for giving proper names to certain exoplanets and their host stars. The process involved public nomination and voting for the new names. In December 2015, the IAU announced the planet would be named "Majriti". The winning name was submitted by the Vega Astronomy Club of Morocco, honoring the 10th-century scientist Maslama al-Majriti.

== Characteristics ==
=== Mass, radius and temperature ===
Upsilon Andromedae d is a super-Jupiter, an exoplanet that has a mass larger than that of the planet Jupiter. It has a temperature of 218 K (−55 °C; −67 °F). It has a mass of 10.25 M_{J} and a likely radius of around 1.02 R_{J} based on its mass.

=== Host star ===
The planet orbits a (F-type) star named Upsilon Andromedae A. The star has a mass of 1.27 M_{☉} and a radius of around 1.48 R_{☉}. It has a temperature of 6,074 K and is 3.12 billion years old. In comparison, the Sun is about 4.6 billion years old and has a temperature of 5,778 K. The star is slightly metal-rich, with a metallicity ([Fe/H]) of 0.09, or about 123% of the solar amount. Its luminosity (L_{☉}) is 3.57 times that of the Sun.

The star's apparent magnitude, or how bright it appears from Earth's perspective, is 4.09. Therefore, Upsilon Andromedae can be seen with the naked eye.

=== Orbit ===
Upsilon Andromedae d orbits its star nearly every 3.5 years (about 1,276 days) in an eccentric orbit, more eccentric than that of any of the known planets in the Solar System. To explain the planet's orbital eccentricity, some have proposed a close encounter with a now-lost outer planet of Upsilon Andromedae A. The encounter would have moved planet "d" into an eccentric orbit closer to the star and ejected the outer planet.

== Habitability ==
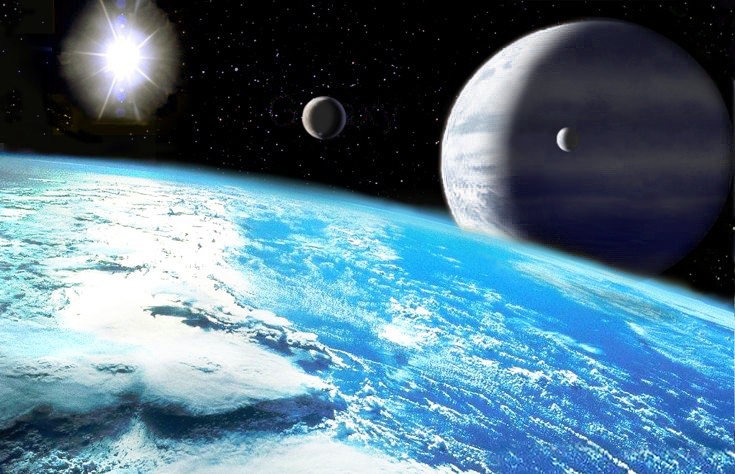
Artist's impression of a potentially habitable exomoon orbiting a gas giant

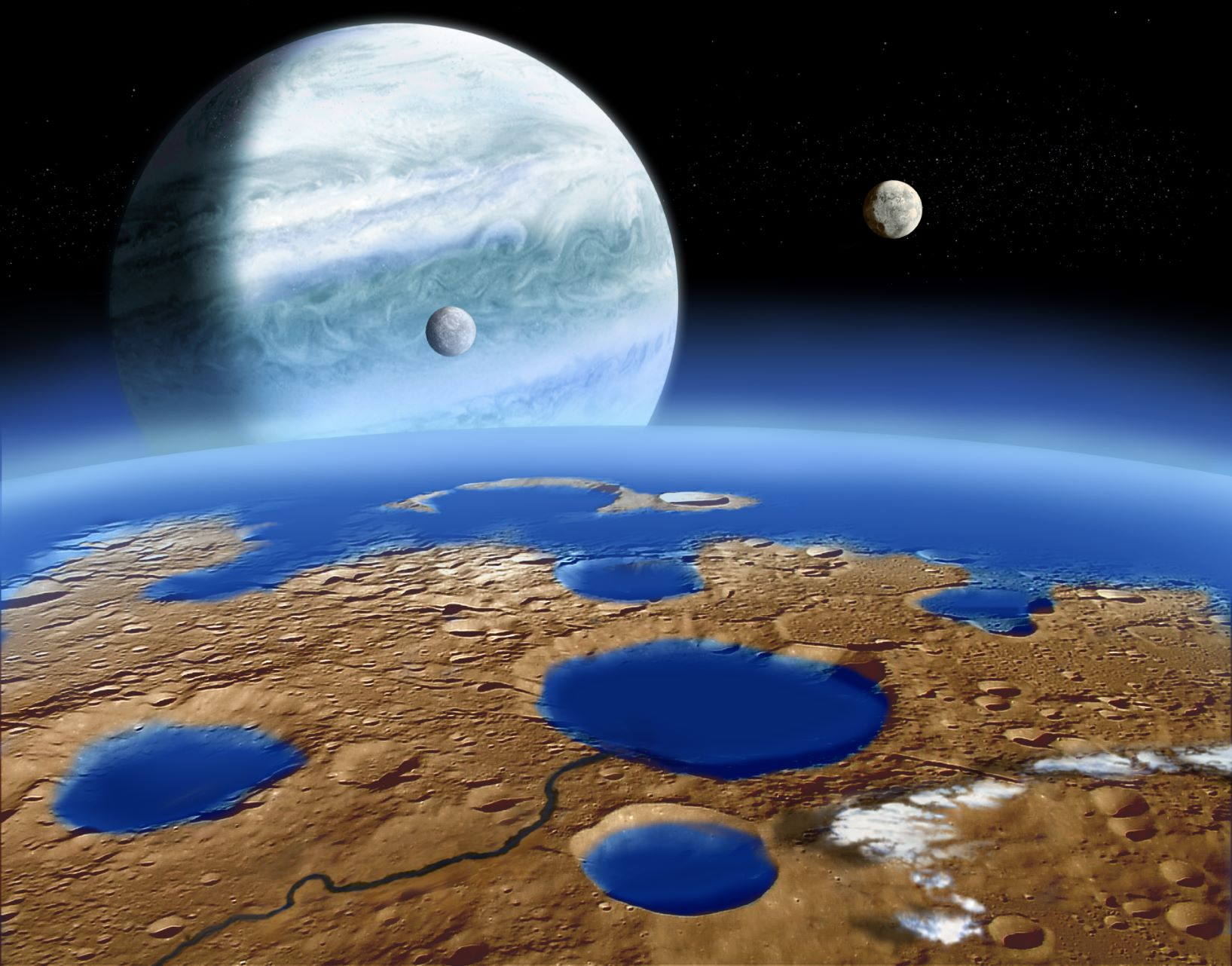
Another artist's impression of theoretical habitable moons

While Upsilon Andromedae d is likely a gas giant and therefore uninhabitable, it may have a moon or moons that are habitable.

The planet lies in the habitable zone of Upsilon Andromedae A as defined both by the ability for an Earthlike world to retain liquid water at its surface and based on the amount of ultraviolet radiation received from the star. For a stable orbit, the ratio between a moon's orbital period P_{s} around its primary and that of the primary (planet) around its star P_{p} must be < 1/9, e.g. if a planet takes 90 days to orbit its star, the maximum stable orbit for a moon of that planet is less than 10 days. Simulations suggest that a moon with an orbital period less than about 45 to 60 days will remain safely bound to a massive giant planet or brown dwarf that orbits 1 AU from a Sun-like star. In the case of Upsilon Andromedae d, the orbital period would have to be no greater than 120 days (around 4 months) in order to have a stable orbit.

== Discovery and further studies ==
Upsilon Andromedae d was detected by measuring variations in its star's radial velocity as a result of the planet's gravity. This was done by making precise measurements of the Doppler shift of the spectrum of Upsilon Andromedae A. At the time of discovery, Upsilon Andromedae A was already known to host one extrasolar planet, the hot Jupiter Upsilon Andromedae b; however, by 1999, it was clear that the inner planet could not explain the velocity curve.

In 1999, astronomers at both San Francisco State University and the Harvard-Smithsonian Center for Astrophysics independently concluded that a three-planet model best fit the data. The two new planets were designated Upsilon Andromedae c and Upsilon Andromedae d.

Preliminary astrometric measurements suggest the orbit of Upsilon Andromedae d may be inclined at 155.5° to the plane of the sky. However, these measurements were later proved useful only for upper limits, and contradict even the inner planet υ And b's inclination of >30°. The mutual inclination between c and d meanwhile is 29.9 degrees. The true inclination of Upsilon Andromedae d was determined as 23.8° after combined results were measured from the Hubble Space Telescope and radial velocity measurements.

When it was discovered, a limitation of the radial velocity method used to detect Upsilon Andromedae d is that the orbital inclination is unknown, and only a lower limit on the planet's mass can be obtained, which was estimated to be about 4.1 times as massive as Jupiter. However, by combining radial velocity measurements from ground-based telescopes with astrometric data from the Hubble Space Telescope, astronomers have determined the orbital inclination as well as the actual mass of the planet, which is about 10.25 times the mass of Jupiter.

== See also ==
- Eccentric Jupiter
- Planetary habitability
- List of exoplanets discovered before 2000
