= TheSkyNet =

Volunteer-computing research project in astronomy

theSkyNet
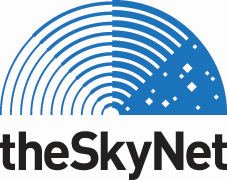

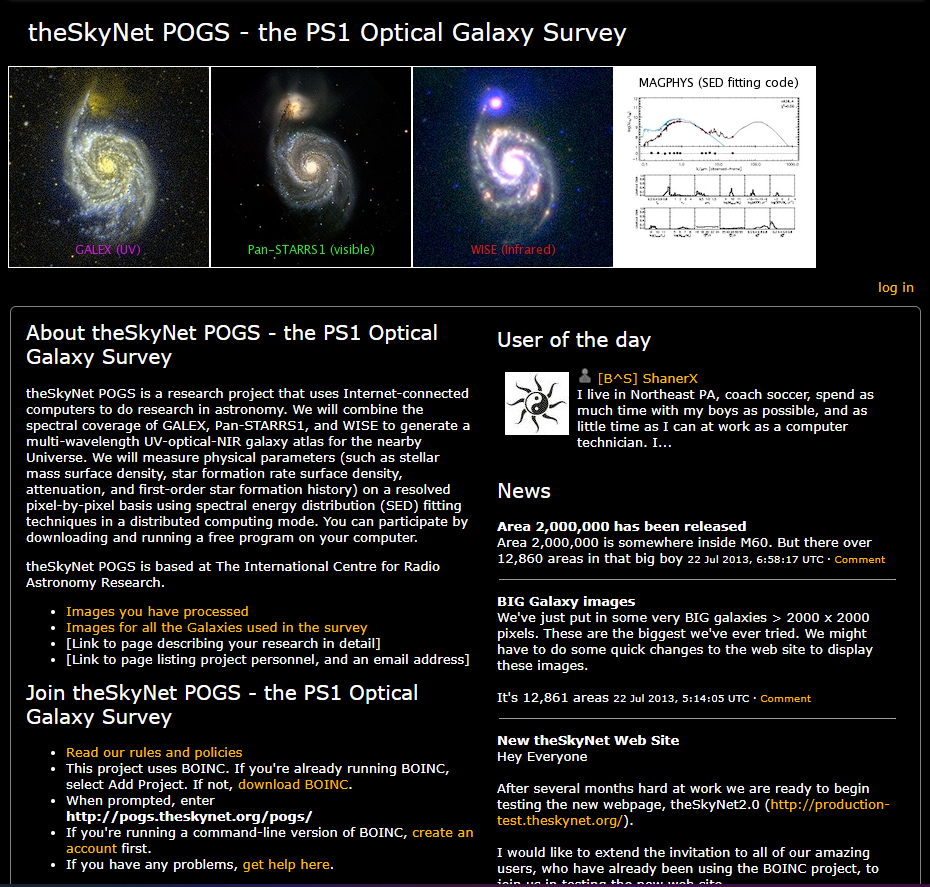
- Platform: BOINC
- Website: www.theskynet.org

theSkyNet was a research project that used volunteer Internet-connected computers to carry out research in astronomy. It was an initiative of the International Centre for Radio Astronomy Research (ICRAR), a joint venture of Curtin University and the University of Western Australia. theSkyNet had two projects, Sourcefinder and POGS. Both projects have been completed. theSkyNet Sourcefinder aimed to test and refine automatic radio sourcefinding algorithms in preparation for radio galaxy surveys using the Australian Square Kilometre Array Pathfinder and the Square Kilometre Array. theSkyNet POGS used Spectral Energy Distribution fitting to calculate characteristics of many galaxies using images taken by the Pan-STARRS PS1 optical telescope in Hawaii.

== History ==
theSkyNet Sourcefinder project was introduced publicly on 13 September 2011, operating on a Java-based user platform, processing data using new distributed computing software called Nereus.

One year later, theSkyNet celebrated its first birthday and at the same time theSkyNet POGS project became the first public Australian based project to participate in the well established volunteer computing platform BOINC. The acronym POGS is a reference to a game played with discs that originated on Maui, Hawaii, in the 1920s, and the fact that the Pan-STARRS PS1 telescope, is situated on Mount Haleakala, Maui. However, the project recast "POGS" as the backronym for "Pan-STARRS Optical Galaxy Survey".

== Scientific objectives ==
The aim of theSkyNet POGS project is to:

- Combine the spectral coverage of GALEX, Pan-STARRS1, and WISE to generate a multi-wavelength (ultra-violet, optical and near infra-red) galaxy atlas for the nearby Universe.
- Calculate the physical parameters of each galaxy, including: star formation rate, stellar mass of the galaxy, dust attenuation, and the total dust mass on a pixel-by-pixel basis using spectral energy distribution fitting techniques.

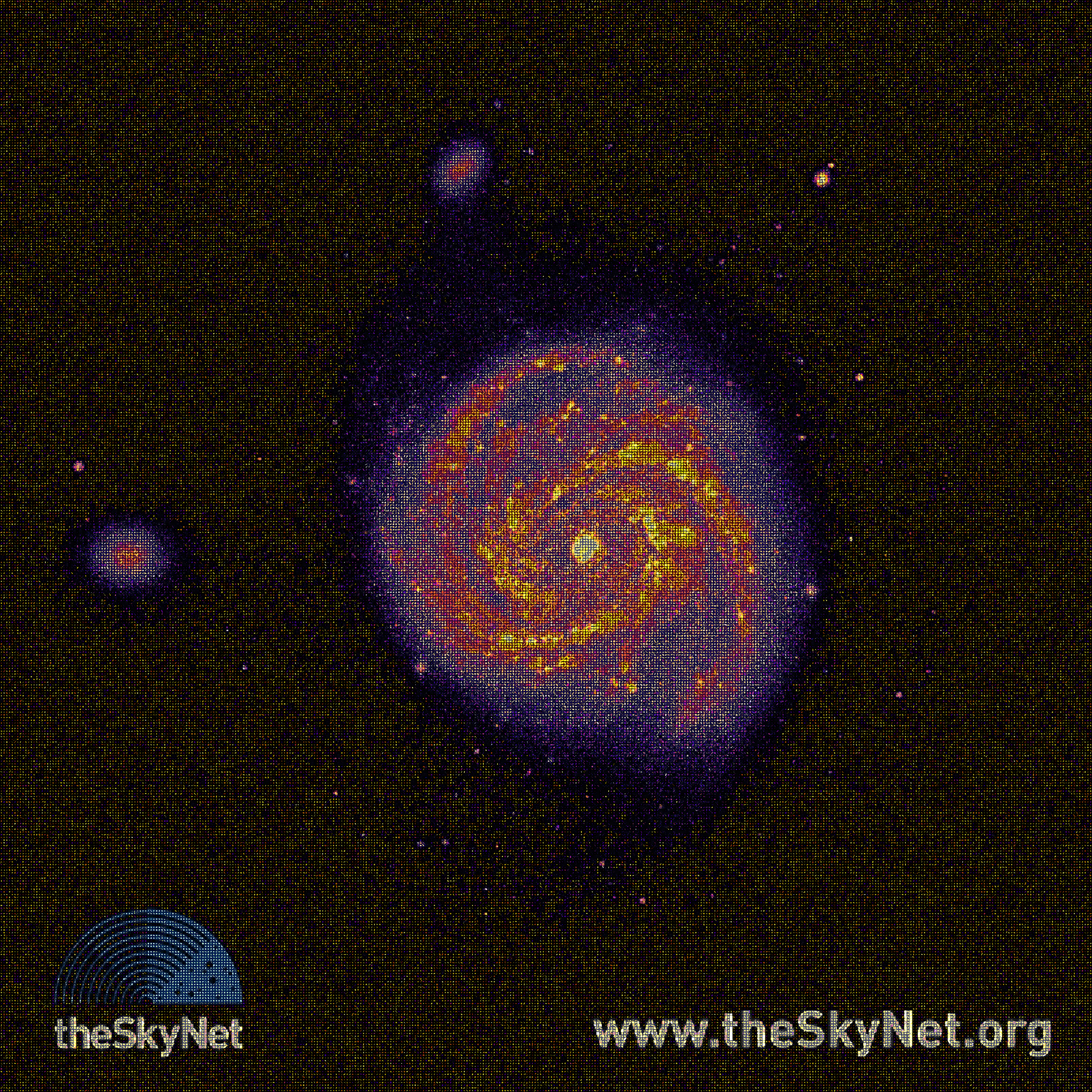
A mosaic of results from theSkyNet, a BOINC based volunteer computing project. The main image shows how fast stars are forming in ‘nearby’ galaxy Messier 100 (M100), white patches are hotbeds of new stars, purple areas are where fewer young stars are forming. Each sub image is results from the other 45,000+ galaxies theSkyNet volunteers have processed. The original data that theSkyNet volunteers processed to make these images is from the Pan-STARRS Optical Galaxy Survey, which is conducted by Pan-STARRS1, a powerful visible light telescope in Hawaii.

The aim of theSkyNet Sourcefinder project is to:

- Refine the use of the Duchamp Sourcefinding algorithm for very large datasets in preparation for next generation radio telescope surveys using Australian Square Kilometre Array Pathfinder and the Square Kilometre Array.

== Software ==
theSkyNet POGS volunteer computing software runs continuously in the background on a computer while a user works, making use of any processor time that would otherwise be unused. It is one of many projects which utilise the Berkeley Open Infrastructure for Network Computing (BOINC) Project Management software platform, which allows users to contribute to a range of volunteer computing projects at the same time.

After a volunteer downloads the BOINC Manager software and elects to join theSkyNet POGS project, work units are requested automatically by the BOINC Manager. These are downloaded and processed automatically on the user's computer, using a percentage of the computer's idle time, according to the parameters set by the volunteer.

On completion of a work unit, the results of the data processing are automatically transmitted back to theSkyNet via the Internet, the user is credited with the work done; and further work is requested.

theSkyNet Sourcefinder, before its closure in early 2014 to undergo redevelopment, used a Java-based custom software either via a browser or installed software. theSkyNet Sourcefinder was redeveloped to use BOINC and VirtualBox.

== Hardware ==
The software runs on Windows, Unix/Linux, Macintosh and Android systems. Some discrepancies have been noted between the results created by Androids and those created by other devices.

theSkyNet POGS project utilised CPUs but did not utilise the power of graphics processing units (GPUs).

== Participation ==
The project is operated by ICRAR in Perth, Western Australia, under the team leadership of Associate Professor Kevin Vinsen. On 13 October 2014, the project's server status page claimed 13,770 unpaid volunteer users worldwide with credit (5,268 with recent credit); and 40,847 computers with credit (16,508 with recent credit).

== Scientific results ==
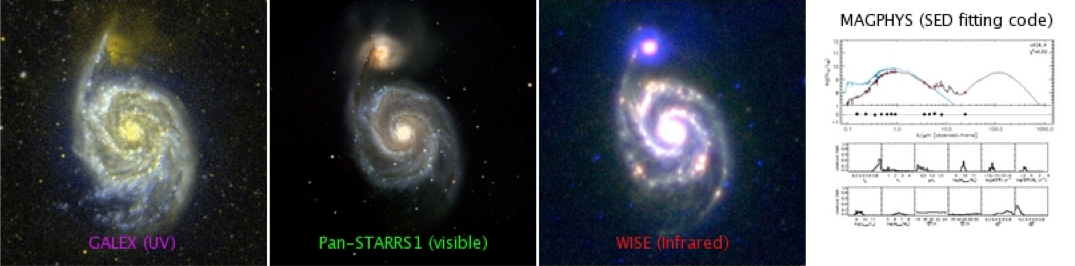
An example of the data that is processed by theSkyNet POGS distributed computing project. Three different images of the same galaxy are shown, at Ultraviolet, Optical and Infrared wavelengths, taken by the GALEX, Pan-STARRS1 and WISE telescopes respectively. The far right image then shows the process used by theSkyNet POGS to determine different characteristics of the galaxy in question using the three images in a process called Spectral Energy Distribution (SED) fitting.

On 7 June 2013 a paper entitled "A BOINC based, citizen-science project for pixel Spectral Energy Distribution fitting of resolved galaxies in multi-wavelength surveys" was submitted for publication. It was last revised on 3 October 2013.

On 23 September 2014, the project Team Leader announced that the project was about to process its 50,000th galaxy.

== Future projects ==
theSkyNet has stated that it may expand to include other projects processing data from new sources, such as the Murchison Widefield Array telescope in Western Australia and perhaps even the Square Kilometre Array.

== See also ==
- List of volunteer computing projects
