= Thai names in space =

Overview of space objects named after Thai people, mythology and places

Several space objects and features have been named after Thai people or things in Thailand. These include planetary features on Mars and Venus, minor planets, and exoplanets.

== Stars and exoplanets ==
As of February 2024, four planets orbiting three different stars have IAU-approved Thai formal names, which they received on three NameExoWorlds campaigns

| Star | Planet | Distance | Named after |
|---|---|---|---|
| Chalawan (47 UMa) | Taphao Thong (47 UMa b) | 45.3 ly | Characters of the folktale Krai Thong |
| Chalawan (47 UMa) | Taphao Kaew (47 UMa c) | 45.3 ly | Characters of the folktale Krai Thong |
| Chaophraya (WASP-50) | Maeping (WASP-50b) | 610 ly | Chao Phraya River and its tributary the Mae Ping |
| Kaewkosin (GJ 3470) | Phailinsiam (GJ 3470 b) | 96 ly | Precious stones in the Thai language |

== Planetary features ==
As of February 2024, there are 11 geological features with IAU-approved Thai names, which are located on Venus and Mars

=== Venus ===
| Feature | Type | Coordinates | Named after | Ref |
|---|---|---|---|---|
| Dhorani | Corona | 8.0°S 243.0°E | Phra Mae Thorani, the Thai earth goddess | |
| Phra Naret | Corona | 66.6°S 209.6°E | King Naresuan, although the IAU refers to a goddess of fertility | |

=== Mars ===
| Feature | Type | Coordinates | Named after | Ref |
|---|---|---|---|---|
| Chatturat | Crater | 35.38°N 265.06°E | Chatturat District, Chaiyaphum | l |
| Dao | Vallis | 37.61°S 88.89°E | Dao, the Thai word for "star" or "planet" | |
| Kantang | Crater | 24.44°S 342.42°E | Kantang District, Trang | |
| Nan | Crater | 26.69°S 340.06°E | Nan Province | |
| Pai | Crater | 41.10°S 37.60°E | Pai District, Mae Hong Son | |
| Phon | Crater | 15.53°N 102.79°E | Phon District, Khon Kaen | |
| Tak | Crater | 26.02°S 331.35°E | Tak Province | |
| Thom | Crater | 41.11°S 92.35°E | Na Thom District, Nakhon Phanom (unclear?) | |
| Yala | Crater | 17.37°N 321.42°E | Yala Province | |

== Asteroids ==
As of February 2024, there are 19 asteroids named after Thai people and places, all of which (except Kridsadaporn) are located in the main asteroid belt between Mars and Jupiter

| Near-Earth obj. | MBA (inner) | MBA (outer) | Centaur |
| Mars-crosser | MBA (middle) | Jupiter trojan | Trans-Neptunian obj. |
| Unclassified |

back to top

| Named minor planet | Provisional | This minor planet was named for... | Ref · Catalog |
|---|---|---|---|
| 6125 Singto | 1989 CN | Singto Pukahuta (1915–2007) was a prominent Thai astronomy educator and author. He was a founder and Director of the Bangkok Planetarium, and president of the Thai Astronomical Society. One of his books, Star Tales, was included in the List of 100 Good Books that Thai Children and Young Adults Should Read | · 6125 |
| 7604 Kridsadaporn | 1995 QY_{2} | Kridsadaporn "San" Ritsmitchai (1964–2004) was born in Songhkla, Thailand. She and her husband Martin Callaway both lived and worked at Siding Spring Observatory. San is remembered in Coonabarabran for her caring nature and community work. She died in a car accident. | · 7604 |
| 13957 NARIT | 1991 AG_{2} | The National Astronomical Research Institute of Thailand (NARIT) was established in 2004 to commemorate the life and work of King Mongkut the "Father of Thai Science" | · 13957 |
| 21464 Chinaroonchai | 1998 HH_{88} | Tanongsak Chinaroonchai, Thai finalist in the 2006 Intel International Science and Engineering Fair (ISEF) † | · 21464 |
| 21540 Itthipanyanan | 1998 QE_{11} | Suksun Itthipanyanan, Thai finalist in the 2006 Intel International Science and Engineering Fair (ISEF) † | · 21540 |
| 21632 Suwanasri | 1999 NR_{11} | Krongrath Suwanasri, Thai finalist in the 2006 Intel ISEF | · 21632 |
| 23308 Niyomsatian | 2001 AS_{21} | Korawich Niyomsatian, Thai winner of the 2007 Intel International Science and Engineering Fair (ISEF) and European Union Contest for Young Scientists (EUCYS) Award recipient | · 23308 |
| 23310 Siriwon | 2001 AA_{25} | Natnaree Siriwon, Thai winner of the 2007 Intel International Science and Engineering Fair (ISEF) and European Union Contest for Young Scientists (EUCYS) Award recipient | · 23310 |
| 23313 Supokaivanich | 2001 AC_{42} | Nathaphon Supokaivanich, Thai winner of the 2007 Intel International Science and Engineering Fair (ISEF) and European Union Contest for Young Scientists (EUCYS) Award recipient | · 23313 |
| 28418 Pornwasu | 1999 VQ_{54} | Pornwasu Pongtheerawan (born 1994) was awarded best of category and first place in the 2011 Intel International Science and Engineering Fair for his environmental management team project. | · 28418 |
| 28419 Tanpitcha | 1999 VA_{67} | Tanpitcha Phongchaipaiboon (born 1993) was awarded best of category and first place in the 2011 Intel International Science and Engineering Fair for her environmental management team project. | · 28419 |
| 28425 Sungkanit | 1999 XL_{24} | Arada Sungkanit (born 1994) was awarded best of category and first place in the 2011 Intel International Science and Engineering Fair for her environmental management team project. | · 28425 |
| 31938 Nattapong | 2000 GL_{99} | Nattapong Chueasiritaworn (born 2000) was awarded best of category award and first place in the 2015 Intel ISEF for his animal sciences team project. He also received the European Union Contest for Young Scientists Award. | · 31938 |
| 31939 Thananon | 2000 GC_{101} | Thananon Hiranwanichchakorn (born 1998) was awarded best of category award and first place in the 2015 Intel ISEF for his animal sciences team project. He also received the European Union Contest for Young Scientists Award. | · 31939 |
| 31940 Sutthiluk | 2000 GQ_{104} | Sutthiluk Rakdee (born 1999) was awarded best of category award and first place in the 2015 Intel International Science and Engineering Fair for her animal sciences team project. | · 31940 |
| 33536 Charpugdee | 1999 HU_{9} | Runglawan Charpugdee (born 1998) was awarded second place in the 2016 Intel International Science and Engineering Fair for her animal sciences team project. She attends the Damrongratsongkroh School, Chiang Rai, Thailand. | · 33536 |
| 33537 Doungnga | 1999 HJ_{10} | Charuntorn Doungnga (born 1998) was awarded second place in the 2016 Intel International Science and Engineering Fair for her animal sciences team project. She attends the Damrongratsongkroh School, Chiang Rai, Thailand. | · 33537 |
| 45692 Poshyachinda | 2000 EJ_{148} | Dr. Saran Poshyachinda (born 1964) is the executive director of NARIT. Encouraging public interest in astronomy, he was crucial in the construction of the Thai National Observatory, regional observatories for the public throughout Thailand and a 40-m radio telescope. | · 45692 |
| 151834 Mongkut | 2003 FB_{122} | King Mongkut (or Rama IV, 1804–1868) was the monarch of Siam from 1851–1868. He embraced Western innovations and initiated the modernization of Siam, both in technology and culture, earning him the nickname "The Father of Science and Technology". | · 151834 |
