= Lemarean Calendar =

The Lemarean Calendar is used by the colonists on the moon Coyote as described in the science fiction trilogy of the same name by author Allen Steele. The trilogy, including Coyote (2002), Coyote Rising (2004), and Coyote Frontier (2005), describes the exploration and settlement of a habitable moon orbiting a ringed jovian in the 47 Ursae Majoris system.

== Background ==
In the novel, Coyote is a natural satellite of Bear, the fourth planet of the 47 Ursae Majoris system, 46 light-years from Earth. It is settled by the crew and passengers of the URSS Alabama, a starship built by the authoritarian conservative United Republic of America but stolen just prior to its scheduled launch. The crew and passengers spend over two centuries in biostasis en route to Coyote, arriving in the system in the Gregorian year 2300. During the voyage, the crew enjoyed the benefits of relativistic velocities; for them, it is the year 2296.

== Calendar ==
Coyote's calendar is based on the sidereal year of its primary, Bear, a slightly elliptical orbit 1,096 days long.

In the novel, the calendar is developed by Ensign Theodore LeMare, shortly after the colonists make planetfall. The colonists begin using the calendar on what is to them January 1, 2297, the equivalent day in the Lemarean system being Uriel 60, C.Y. 01 (Coyote Year 1).

There are 12 months in the Lamarean calendar, named after the twelve governing angels of Earth's months in the gnostic Christian pantheon. Every three months corresponds roughly to a season on Coyote. They include Gabriel, Barchiel and Machidiel (winter); Asmodel, Ambriel and Muriel (spring); Verchiel, Hamaliel and Uriel (summer); Adnachiel, Barbiel and Hanael (autumn).

The 9 days of the Lamarean week are named for the angelic governors of the seven planets known to the ancient Greeks. They include Raphael, Anael, Michael, Zaphael, Kafziel, Sammael, Camael, Zamael and Orifiel.

GABRIEL									BARCHIEL									MACHIDIEL
Ra	An	Mi	Zp	Ka	Sa	Cm	Zm	Or	Ra	An	Mi	Zp	Ka	Sa	Cm	Zm	Or	Ra	An	Mi	Zp	Ka	Sa	Cm	Zm	Or
1	2	3	4	5	6	7	8	9	1	2	3	4	5	6	7	8	9	1	2	3	4	5	6	7	8	9
10	11	12	13	14	15	16	17	18	10	11	12	13	14	15	16	17	18	10	11	12	13	14	15	16	17	18
19	20	21	22	23	24	25	26	27	19	20	21	22	23	24	25	26	27	19	20	21	22	23	24	25	26	27
28	29	30	31	32	33	34	35	36	28	29	30	31	32	33	34	35	36	28	29	30	31	32	33	34	35	36
37	38	39	40	41	42	43	44	45	37	38	39	40	41	42	43	44	45	37	38	39	40	41	42	43	44	45
46	47	48	49	50	51	52	53	54	46	47	48	49	50	51	52	53	54	46	47	48	49	50	51	52	53	54
55	56	57	58	59	60	61	62	63	55	56	57	58	59	60	61	62	63	55	56	57	58	59	60	61	62	63
64	65	66	67	68	69	70	71	72	64	65	66	67	68	69	70	71	72	64	65	66	67	68	69	70	71	72
73	74	75	76	77	78	79	80	81	73	74	75	76	77	78	79	80	81	73	74	75	76	77	78	79	80	81
82	83	84	85	86	87	88	89	90	82	83	84	85	86	87	88	89	90	82	83	84	85	86	87	88	89	90
91									91									91	92
ASMODEL									AMBRIEL									MURIEL
Ra	An	Mi	Zp	Ka	Sa	Cm	Zm	Or	Ra	An	Mi	Zp	Ka	Sa	Cm	Zm	Or	Ra	An	Mi	Zp	Ka	Sa	Cm	Zm	Or
1	2	3	4	5	6	7	8	9	1	2	3	4	5	6	7	8	9	1	2	3	4	5	6	7	8	9
10	11	12	13	14	15	16	17	18	10	11	12	13	14	15	16	17	18	10	11	12	13	14	15	16	17	18
19	20	21	22	23	24	25	26	27	19	20	21	22	23	24	25	26	27	19	20	21	22	23	24	25	26	27
28	29	30	31	32	33	34	35	36	28	29	30	31	32	33	34	35	36	28	29	30	31	32	33	34	35	36
37	38	39	40	41	42	43	44	45	37	38	39	40	41	42	43	44	45	37	38	39	40	41	42	43	44	45
46	47	48	49	50	51	52	53	54	46	47	48	49	50	51	52	53	54	46	47	48	49	50	51	52	53	54
55	56	57	58	59	60	61	62	63	55	56	57	58	59	60	61	62	63	55	56	57	58	59	60	61	62	63
64	65	66	67	68	69	70	71	72	64	65	66	67	68	69	70	71	72	64	65	66	67	68	69	70	71	72
73	74	75	76	77	78	79	80	81	73	74	75	76	77	78	79	80	81	73	74	75	76	77	78	79	80	81
82	83	84	85	86	87	88	89	90	82	83	84	85	86	87	88	89	90	82	83	84	85	86	87	88	89	90
91									91									91	92
VERCHIEL									HAMALIEL									URIEL
Ra	An	Mi	Zp	Ka	Sa	Cm	Zm	Or	Ra	An	Mi	Zp	Ka	Sa	Cm	Zm	Or	Ra	An	Mi	Zp	Ka	Sa	Cm	Zm	Or
1	2	3	4	5	6	7	8	9	1	2	3	4	5	6	7	8	9	1	2	3	4	5	6	7	8	9
10	11	12	13	14	15	16	17	18	10	11	12	13	14	15	16	17	18	10	11	12	13	14	15	16	17	18
19	20	21	22	23	24	25	26	27	19	20	21	22	23	24	25	26	27	19	20	21	22	23	24	25	26	27
28	29	30	31	32	33	34	35	36	28	29	30	31	32	33	34	35	36	28	29	30	31	32	33	34	35	36
37	38	39	40	41	42	43	44	45	37	38	39	40	41	42	43	44	45	37	38	39	40	41	42	43	44	45
46	47	48	49	50	51	52	53	54	46	47	48	49	50	51	52	53	54	46	47	48	49	50	51	52	53	54
55	56	57	58	59	60	61	62	63	55	56	57	58	59	60	61	62	63	55	56	57	58	59	60	61	62	63
64	65	66	67	68	69	70	71	72	64	65	66	67	68	69	70	71	72	64	65	66	67	68	69	70	71	72
73	74	75	76	77	78	79	80	81	73	74	75	76	77	78	79	80	81	73	74	75	76	77	78	79	80	81
82	83	84	85	86	87	88	89	90	82	83	84	85	86	87	88	89	90	82	83	84	85	86	87	88	89	90
91									91									91	92
ADNACHIEL									BARBIEL									HANAEL
Ra	An	Mi	Zp	Ka	Sa	Cm	Zm	Or	Ra	An	Mi	Zp	Ka	Sa	Cm	Zm	Or	Ra	An	Mi	Zp	Ka	Sa	Cm	Zm	Or
1	2	3	4	5	6	7	8	9	1	2	3	4	5	6	7	8	9	1	2	3	4	5	6	7	8	9
10	11	12	13	14	15	16	17	18	10	11	12	13	14	15	16	17	18	10	11	12	13	14	15	16	17	18
19	20	21	22	23	24	25	26	27	19	20	21	22	23	24	25	26	27	19	20	21	22	23	24	25	26	27
28	29	30	31	32	33	34	35	36	28	29	30	31	32	33	34	35	36	28	29	30	31	32	33	34	35	36
37	38	39	40	41	42	43	44	45	37	38	39	40	41	42	43	44	45	37	38	39	40	41	42	43	44	45
46	47	48	49	50	51	52	53	54	46	47	48	49	50	51	52	53	54	46	47	48	49	50	51	52	53	54
55	56	57	58	59	60	61	62	63	55	56	57	58	59	60	61	62	63	55	56	57	58	59	60	61	62	63
64	65	66	67	68	69	70	71	72	64	65	66	67	68	69	70	71	72	64	65	66	67	68	69	70	71	72
73	74	75	76	77	78	79	80	81	73	74	75	76	77	78	79	80	81	73	74	75	76	77	78	79	80	81
82	83	84	85	86	87	88	89	90	82	83	84	85	86	87	88	89	90	82	83	84	85	86	87	88	89	90
91									91									91	92

== Important Dates ==
Event	Lamarean Date	Gregorian Date, relativistic	Gregorian Date, Earth
First Landing Day	(Annael) Uriel 47, C.Y. 01	(Saturday) December 19, 2296	(Friday) September 7, 2300
Lamarean Calendar Introduced	(Sammael) Uriel 60, C.Y. 01	(Friday) January 1, 2297	(Thursday) September 20, 2300
First Human Born on Coyote	Uriel 52, C.Y. 02	(Monday) December 25, 2299	(Sunday) September 13, 2303
