= Coyote (novel) =

2002 science fiction novel by Allen Steele

- First edition (publ. Ace Books); Cover artist: Ron Miller
- Author: Allen Steele
- Genre: Science fiction
- Publisher: Ace Books
- Publication date: November 5, 2002
- ISBN: 978-0-441-00974-9

Coyote (2002) is a science fiction novel by American writer Allen Steele, the first in a series of eight books. It is a fixup of several of Steele's previously published short stories, beginning with Stealing Alabama in the January 2001 issue of Asimov's Science Fiction.

The series has been noted for the constructed Lemarean Calendar the author created for its inhabited extrasolar moon, Coyote.

== Plot summary ==
The year is 2070. The United Republic of America, under an authoritarian conservative New Christian Right regime constructed after the Second American Revolution, is managed by Liberty Party autocrats. It faces economic sanctions from other powers due to its repressive and xenophobic policies, notably its unilateral establishment of an orbiting nuclear weapons delivery system. The nation has built its first starship: the URSS Alabama. The welcoming celebration for Captain Robert E. Lee takes a sudden turn when Lee initiates his plan to steal the Alabama. Working with a handful of conspirators, Lee manages to alter the computer software and override the clearance codes. URS soldiers storm aboard to stop Lee, but they are too late. Not wishing to abandon their orders, Colonel Reese and the other soldiers become stowaways.

Captain Lee's destination: the 47 Ursae Majoris system, some 46 light years away—far enough to escape the United Republic. At a cruise velocity of .2 c, Alabama would not arrive at its destination until 230 Earth years have passed. The crew of 104 soldiers, scientists, and civilians were put in biostasis, to be awakened from their virtual immortality by the ship's AI 226 years into the future. (Four years are spared due to time dilation.) 47 Ursae Majoris' system has four planets—named Fox, Raven, Bear and Wolf after Native American mythology. Bear has six satellites—Dog, Hawk, Eagle, Coyote, Snake and Goat. Of these six, Coyote is large enough to support its own biosphere.

Three months into the journey, Leslie Gillis, the senior communications officer, is awakened from biostasis. Expecting the year to be 2300, Gillis is horrified when he questions the AI. Owing to a mixup, it is now impossible for Gillis to return to his dreamless sleep. His options are either suicide or a lonely existence. Gillis decides to live.

After a brief chat with the AI, Gillis learns that Eric Gunther was originally scheduled to awaken three months into the trip. Gunther is an agent for the URA, and was to attempt to contact the president or destroy the ship. The program was changed at the last minute to wake someone else instead—Gillis. Gillis leaves a note for Captain Lee explaining Gunther's plot. Why they were changed at the last minute remains a mystery, but it was a change that would cost Gillis his life.

During his solitary life, he does everything he can to keep from going insane, attempting to eat and sleep at regular hours, reading all of the books available, playing chess against the AI, writing stories, and painting. Using practically all of the ship's art supplies, Gillis creates a story about a prince named Rupurt and the fantastic alien world he lives in. He paints scenes of his books on the walls. Eventually, Gillis dies in his old age after a fall from a ladder while trying to get a better look at an alien ship he has seen. The AI automatically expels his body into space and sails on to 47 Ursae Majoris with no more incidents.

The crew is awakened as planned in the year 2300. The Alabama has entered the 47 Ursae Majoris system and is approaching its third planet, Bear (currently known as 47 Ursae Majoris b) is a gas giant. Coyote, its fourth moon, is larger than Mars and is lush with green plants and rivers of water. This will be the crew's new home. Captain Lee directs the landing procedures of the two ships docked to the Alabama, the Wallace and the Helms.

The crew finds Coyote to be habitable, but very peculiar nevertheless. Its seasons change at a much slower rate than Earth's. A year for Coyote consists of 1,096 days, with days lasting 27 hours. Lifeforms on Coyote seem similar to those on Earth at first glance, but behave in unique ways. As described in Gillis' novel, the world is home to gigantic bird-like creatures which are anything but friendly. The settlers call them "boids", which is Gillis' term for the beasts in his novel. Boids are common in the grasslands around the new settlement.

The remainder of Coyote follows the adventures of Carlos Montero and Wendy Gunther along the banks of the equatorial river which stretches around Coyote.

== Characters ==
- Captain Robert E. Lee, the leader and Captain of the URSS Alabama
- Colonel Gill Reese, a URS soldier
- Leslie Gillis, the senior communications officer
- Eric Gunther, a URA agent
- Wendy Gunther, Eric Gunther's teenage daughter
- Jorge and Rita Montero, civilians who help to steal the Alabama
- Carlos Montero, the son of Jorge and Rita

== Sequels ==
Coyote trilogy:

- Coyote (November 2002)
- Coyote Rising (December 2004)
- Coyote Frontier (December 2005)

Spindrift trilogy (set in the same universe as Coyote, but not directly tied to its events):

- Spindrift (April 2007)
- Galaxy Blues (April 2008)
- Hex (June 2011)

Coyote Chronicles duology:

- Coyote Horizon (March 2009)
- Coyote Destiny (March 2010)
