= 47 Ursae Majoris d =

Extrasolar planet in the constellation Ursa Major

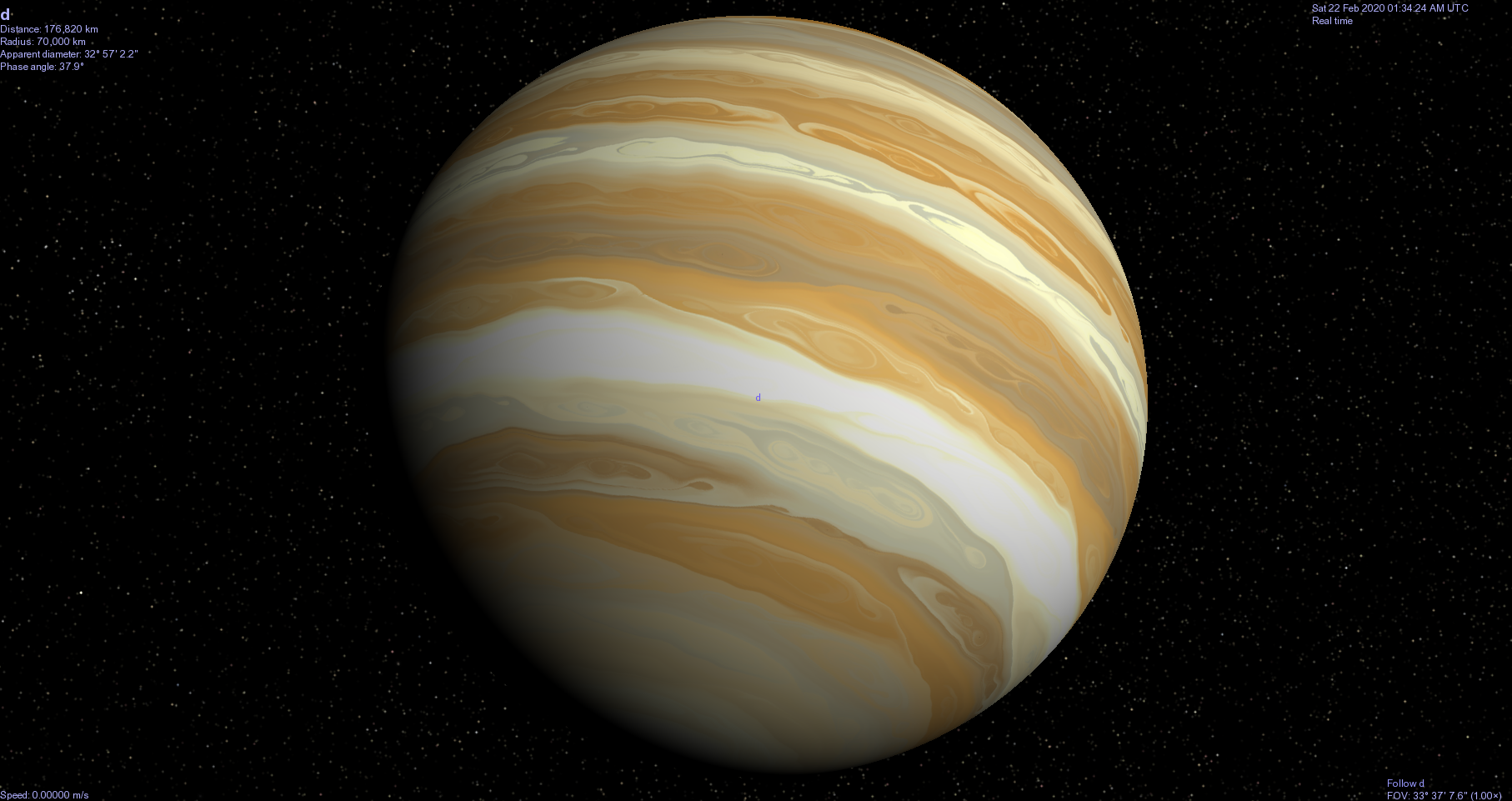
- An artist's impression of 47 UMa d

Discovery
- Discovered by: Gregory and Fischer
- Discovery site: United States
- Discovery date: 6 March 2010
- Detection method: Doppler spectroscopy (Bayesian Kepler periodogram)

Orbital characteristics
- Semi-major axis: 11.6^{+2.1}_{−2.9} AU
- Eccentricity: 0.16^{+0.09}_{−0.16}
- Orbital period (sidereal): 14,002^{+4018}_{−5095} d ~38.33 y
- Time of periastron: 2,451,736^{+6783}_{−5051}
- Argument of periastron: 110^{+132}_{−160}
- Star: 47 Ursae Majoris

47 Ursae Majoris d (sometimes abbreviated 47 Uma d) is an extrasolar planet approximately 46 light-years away in the constellation of Ursa Major. The planet was discovered located in a long-period orbit (38 years) around the star 47 Ursae Majoris. As of 2011, it is the outermost of three known planets in its planetary system. It has a mass of at least 1.64 times that of Jupiter. It is the longest-period planet detected by Doppler spectroscopy. The evidence of this planet was found by Bayesian Kepler periodogram in March 2010.

Orbits of the 47 Ursae Majoris system planets. 47 UMa d is the outermost planet.
