= 47 Ursae Majoris c =

Gas giant orbiting 47 Ursae Majoris

47 Ursae Majoris c / Taphao Kaew
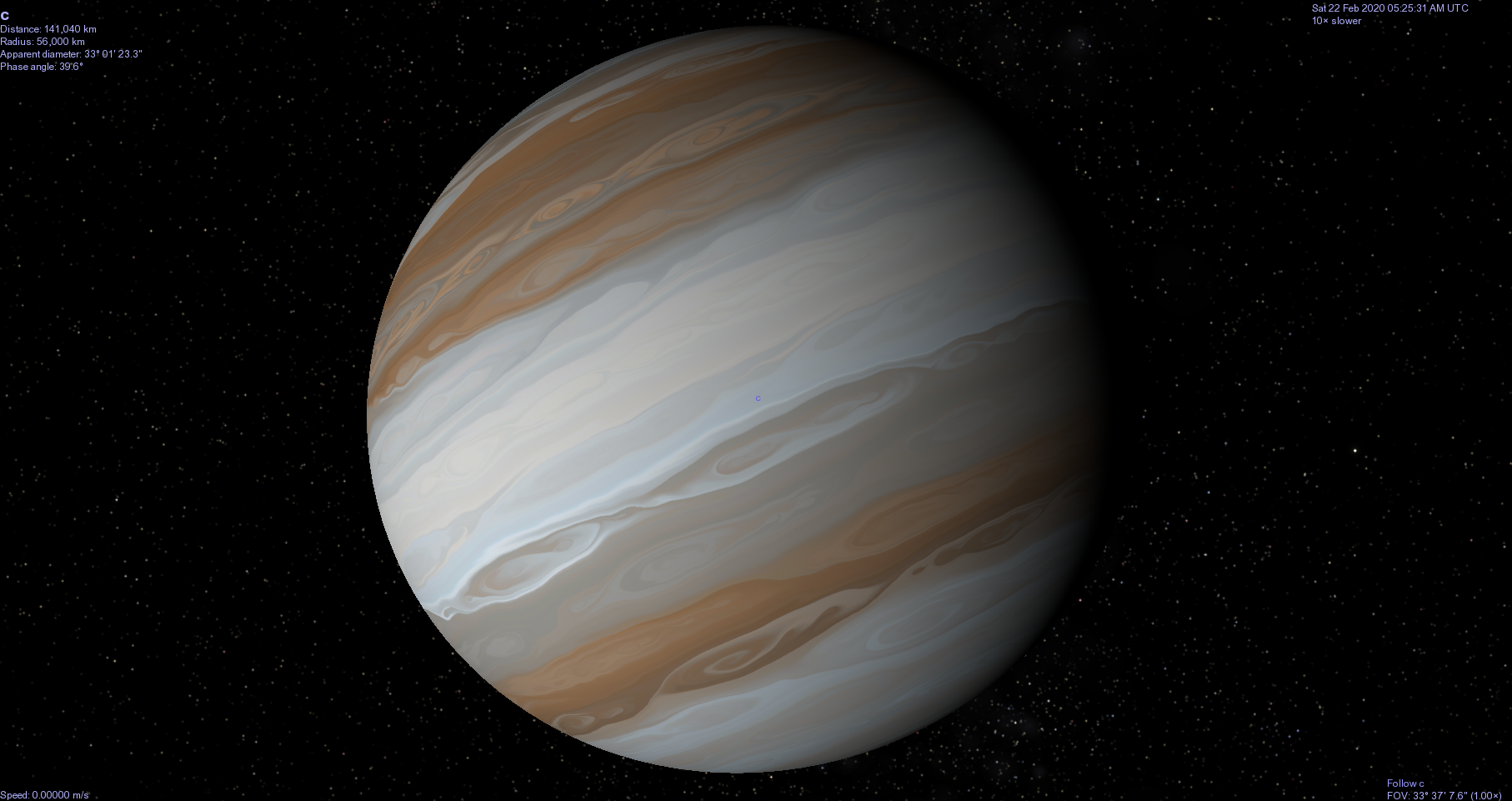
- An artist's impression of 47 UMa c

Discovery
- Discovered by: Fischer, Butler, and Marcy et al.
- Discovery site: United States
- Discovery date: 15 August 2001; 19 March 2002 (confirmed)
- Detection method: Doppler spectroscopy

Orbital characteristics
- Semi-major axis: 3.6 ± 0.1 astronomical units (539 ± 15 million kilometres)
- Eccentricity: 0.098^{+0.047}_{−0.096}
- Orbital period (sidereal): 2391^{+100}_{−70} d ~6.55 y
- Time of periastron: 2,452,441^{+628}_{−825}
- Argument of periastron: 295^{+114}_{−160}
- Semi-amplitude: 7.0 ± 2.3
- Star: 47 Ursae Majoris

47 Ursae Majoris c (abbreviated 47 UMa c), formally named Taphao Kaew (/təˌpaʊ ˈɡaʊ/ tə-POW GOW; Thai: ตะเภาแก้ว [tāpʰāwkɛ̂ːw]) is an extrasolar planet approximately 46 light-years from Earth in the constellation of Ursa Major. The planet was discovered located in a long-period orbit around the star 47 Ursae Majoris. Its orbit lasts 6.55 years, and the planet has a mass at least 0.540 times that of Jupiter.

== Name ==
The planet is named after one of two sisters associated with a Thai folk tale.

In July 2014 the International Astronomical Union launched NameExoWorlds, a process for giving proper names to certain exoplanets and their host stars. The process involved public nomination and voting for the new names. In December 2015, the IAU announced the winning name was Taphao Kaew, submitted by the Thai Astronomical Society of Thailand.

== Discovery ==
Orbits of the 47 Ursae Majoris system planets. 47 UMa c is the middle planet.

Like many known extrasolar planets at the time, 47 Ursae Majoris c was discovered by detecting changes in its star's radial velocity caused by the planet's gravity. This was done by measuring the Doppler shift of the star's spectrum.

At the time of discovery in 2001, 47 Ursae Majoris was already known to host one extrasolar planet, designated 47 Ursae Majoris b. Further measurements of the radial velocity revealed another periodicity in the data unaccounted for by the first planet. This periodicity could be explained by assuming that a second planet, designated 47 Ursae Majoris c, existed in the system with an orbital period close to 7 years. Observations of the photosphere of 47 Ursae Majoris suggested that the periodicity could not be explained by stellar activity, making the planet interpretation more likely. The planet was announced in 2002.

Further measurements of 47 Ursae Majoris failed to detect the planet, calling its existence into question. Furthermore, it was noted that the data used to determine its existence left the planet's parameters "almost unconstrained". A more recent study with datasets spanning over 6,900 days concluded that while the existence of a second planet in the system is likely, periods around 2,500 days have high false-alarm probabilities, and gave a best-fit period of 7,586 days (almost 21 years).

In 2010, a study was published that determined that three giant planets orbiting 47 Ursae Majoris, including one at 2,391 days that corresponds well with the original claims for 47 Ursae Majoris c.

== Physical characteristics ==
Since 47 Ursae Majoris c was detected indirectly, properties such as its radius, composition, and temperature are unknown. Based on its high mass, the planet is likely to be a gas giant with no solid surface.
