= Spindrift (novel) =

2007 novel by Allen Steele

- First edition
- Author: Allen Steele
- Cover artist: John Harris
- Language: English
- Genre: Science fiction
- Publisher: Ace Books
- Publication date: 2007
- Media type: Print
- Pages: 347
- ISBN: 978-0-441-01471-2
- OCLC: 71329823
- Dewey Decimal: 813/.54 22
- LC Class: PS3569.T338425 S65 2007

Spindrift is a 2007 science fiction novel by American writer Allen Steele. Spindrift is set within the same universe as the Coyote trilogy but was written as a stand-alone novel. Steele has stated that he wrote Spindrift because he was "tired of the militaristic sort of space opera that says that any contact between humans and aliens will necessarily be hostile".

== Plot summary ==
In 2288 A.D. Jared Ramirez is serving a life sentence on the moon for his role in an attempt to reduce the human population by one-third. A telescopic array that he designed and programmed has received a transmission that is clearly alien. John Shillinglaw, Associate Director of the European Space Agency arranges for him to be a member of the science team aboard the spaceship Galileo which will explore the source of the transmission, an object that has been dubbed "Spindrift".

Ted Harker is the efficient, respected first officer of the Galileo. He serves under Ian Lawrence, the arrogant but politically minded and well connected Captain. Ted discovers that the Captain has taken surreptitious measures that may poison a potential first contact with an alien species. After surviving the trip to Spindrift, the captain seems almost too anxious for Ted to lead a group of four to explore Spindrift while the rest of the crew visit what looks like a hyperspace gate that is orbiting nearby. Harker's team makes amazing discoveries, witnesses the destruction of the Galileo, and meets an alien who makes a surprising suggestion for what humans could use for space trade.

== Characters ==
- Ted Harker – First officer of exploration spaceship Galileo
- Emily Collins – Space shuttle pilot, lover of Ted Harker
- Ian Lawrence – Captain of the Galileo as the result of political connections
- Jared Ramirez – Astrobiologist, convict, created telescopic array that makes first contact
- John Shillinglaw – Associate Director of the European Space Agency

== Reception ==
Reception for Spindrift has been positive. SF Site reviewed the novel, praising Steele's writing style and saying the book was "interesting and well written enough". SF Crowsnest wrote that "overall, 'Spindrift' is a very solid novel but not as essential as the first couple of 'Coyote' books." BookReporter.com praised Spindrift, calling it "a fill-in, but it is worthy mortar in the monument of Steele's great future-history epic about daring deep space exploration and world-building." Publishers Weekly cited that the book was "a gripping saga of humanity on the verge of exploring the larger universe". The Library Journal also reviewed Spindrift, writing that it was "a strong addition to most sf collections." SFScope positively reviewed Spindrift. RT Book Reviews gave the book four and a half stars, citing the technology and scientific concepts as a highlight.
