= Astronomers for Planet Earth =

Volunteer network of astronomers

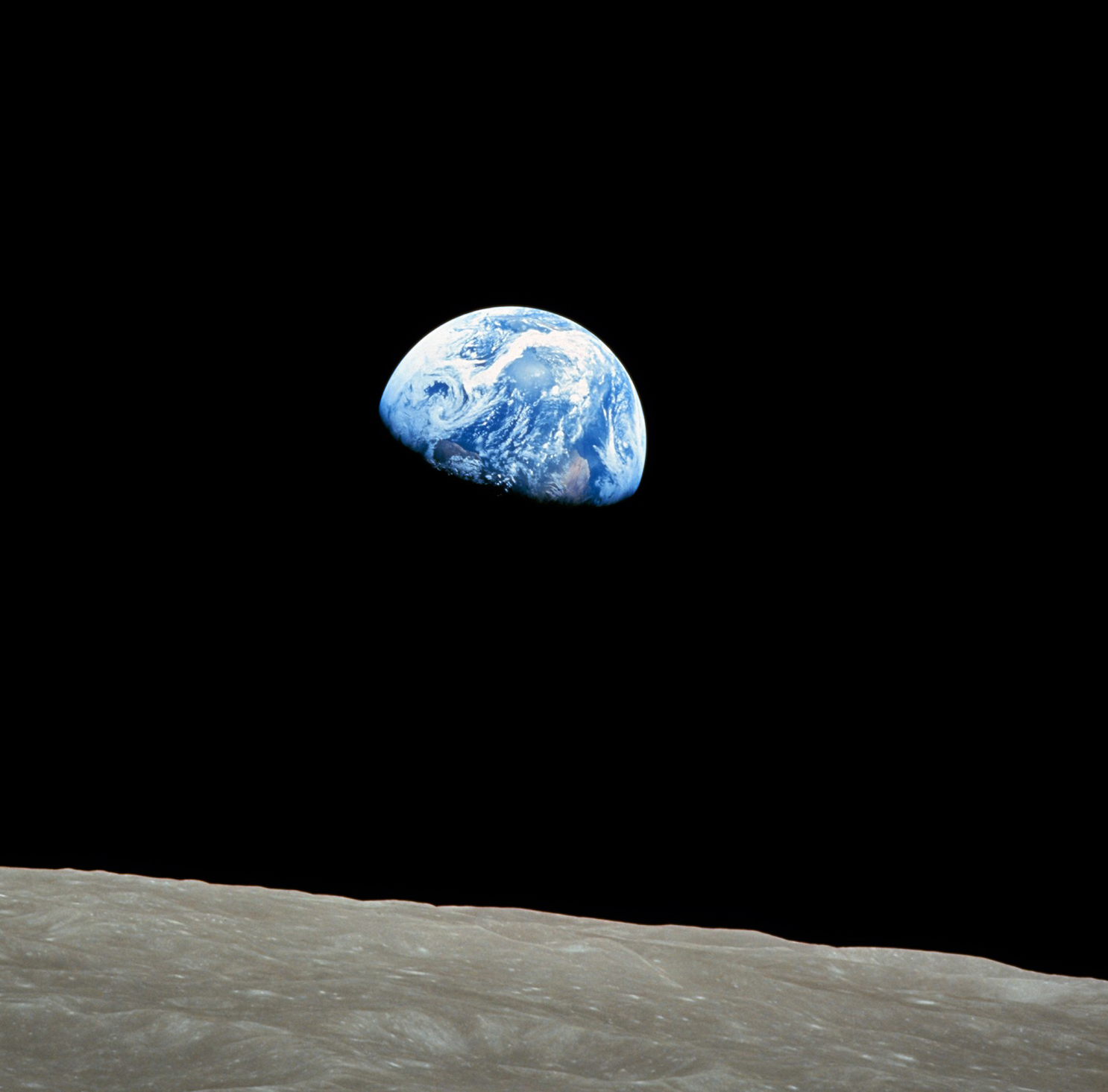
Earthrise over the Moon, as imaged by Apollo 8 crew member William Anders on December 24, 1968.

Astronomers for Planet Earth (A4E) is an international volunteer network of astronomy students, educators, amateurs and scientists, working to address the climate crisis from an astronomical perspective. A4E aspires to be a hub for the astronomical community to engage in the quest to counter this potentially global catastrophic risk by facilitating collaboration, providing resources, and sharing information on strategies for mitigation. The network identifies with iconic images of the Earth from space, such as Earthrise and Pale Blue Dot, which serve to illustrate humanity's minuscule and ephemeral place in the cosmos. From its beginning in 2019, membership had grown to more than 2300 individuals across 85 countries by mid 2025.

== Goals ==
The mission statement of Astronomers for Planet Earth lists the following goals:

- To mobilize and empower the global astronomical community to take action on the climate crisis.
- To provide the public with information to address the climate crisis.
- To share astronomers' unique perspective on planet Earth.
- To explain the science behind Earth’s warming climate.
- To share ideas and solutions for reversing climate change.
- To provide astronomers with tools to address the climate crisis.
- To establish a community to amplify our individual voices and provide opportunities for meaningful action.
- To gather and share resources to educate ourselves, our students and the public as we work together to combat climate change.

The eligibility of and motivation for astronomers to address these issues is discussed in detail in the Climate Change Task Force Report for the American Astronomical Society and other publications. Interdisciplinary collaborations between astronomers and Earth scientists grew from the need to understand planets in a broader context, as the result of planetary exploration within our Solar System and the discovery of exoplanets around other stars. The search for extraterrestrial life, one of the most fundamental goals in the astronomical sciences, requires an understanding of the conditions that make a planet habitable to life as we know it, and the factors that might cause those conditions to change over time. Venus, our nearest planetary neighbor, provides a well-studied example of a runaway greenhouse effect, an outcome extremely detrimental to life.

== Outreach and education ==
The A4E community recognizes that general public interest in astronomy provides astronomers with opportunities to engage with others on issues related to climate change, both informally and in college-level education. At college level, a well-taught astronomy course may enhance the engagement of students in science, an influence by no means limited to the STEM fields (science, technology, engineering and mathematics). By integrating elements of climate science into general courses, astronomers have opportunities to heighten the understanding of key issues among the next generation of professionals across a wide range of career paths.

== Reducing astronomy's carbon footprint ==
The A4E network is committed to communicating ideas and proposing strategies that enable greenhouse gas emissions to be reduced, both within and beyond the profession. Several studies have assessed the carbon footprints of facilities and activities essential to astronomers, including ground-based observatories, space telescopes, supercomputers, and travel. As a result of these studies, strategies have been identified that enable significant reductions to be made. These include an ongoing transition to green energy sources used to power observatories, computational facilities and internet web servers used by astronomers. They also include effective provision for web conferencing methods of attendance at scientific conferences and meetings, thus reducing the need for long-distance travel. The community continues to recognize the value of in-person interactions, however, with support for hybrid meetings that enable attendees to opt for either online or in-person attendance. A4E has published guidelines for meeting planning with the aim of achieving greater sustainability, whilst ensuring a thriving community based on diversity, equity, and inclusion.
