= GJ 3470 =

Star in the constellation Cancer

GJ 3470 / Kaewkosin
Observation data Epoch J2000 Equinox ICRS
- Constellation: Cancer
- Right ascension: 07^{h} 59^{m} 05.83953^{s}
- Declination: +15° 23′ 29.2361″
- Apparent magnitude (V): 12.330

Characteristics
- Evolutionary stage: Main sequence
- Spectral type: M2.0Ve
- Apparent magnitude (B): 13.5
- Apparent magnitude (V): 12.330
- Apparent magnitude (R): 11.934
- Apparent magnitude (J): 8.794
- Apparent magnitude (H): 8.206
- Apparent magnitude (K): 7.989
- B−V color index: 1.17
- V−R color index: 0.396
- J−H color index: 0.588
- J−K color index: 0.217

Astrometry
Radial velocity (R_{v})	25.95±0.25 km/s
Proper motion (μ)	RA: -185.706 mas/yr Dec.: -56.994 mas/yr
Parallax (π)	34.0172±0.0255 mas
Distance	95.88 ± 0.07 ly (29.40 ± 0.02 pc)

Details
Mass	0.457+0.057 −0.044 M_{☉}
Radius	0.513+0.014 −0.008 R_{☉}
Luminosity (bolometric)	0.029±0.002 L_{☉}
Surface gravity (log g)	4.678+0.040 −0.041 cgs
Temperature	3577+19 −51 K
Metallicity [Fe/H]	0.20±0.10 dex
Rotation	21.54±0.49 d
Age	0.3-3 Gyr

Other designations
- Kaewkosin, GJ 3470, LP 424-4, NLTT 18739, PM J07590+1523, TIC 19028197, 2MASS J07590587+1523294

Database references
SIMBAD	data
Exoplanet Archive	data

GJ 3470, proper name Kaewkosin, is a red dwarf star located in the constellation of Cancer, 96 light-years (29 parsecs) away from Earth. With a faint apparent magnitude of 12.3, it is not visible to the naked eye. It hosts one known exoplanet, GJ 3470 b.

== Nomenclature ==
The designation GJ 3470 comes from the Gliese Catalogue of Nearby Stars. This star was first included in the Third Catalogue of Nearby Stars, published in 1991 by Gliese and Jahreiß, hence the GJ prefix usually used for this star.

In August 2022, GJ 3470 and its planet were included among 20 planetary systems to be named by the third NameExoWorlds project. The approved names, proposed by a team from Thailand, were announced in June 2023. GJ 3470 is named Kaewkosin and its planet is named Phailinsiam, after names of precious stones in the Thai language.

== Properties ==
The star has a mass of 0.539 solar masses, a radius of 0.547 solar radii, and a temperature of about 3,652 K (3,379 °C; 6,114 °F). It is about 0.3-3 billion years old, with a metallicity of 0.2 Fe/H and a rotation period of 21.54 days. The star exhibits strong stellar activity, with three ultraviolet flares detected by 2021.

== Planetary system ==
At least one exoplanet has been discovered orbiting GJ 3470 at a distance of 0.035 astronomical units. The exoplanet, which is called GJ 3470 b, is a hot Neptune with an orbital period of 3.3 days. It was discovered in 2012 using radial velocity observations from HARPS, and transit observations from TRAPPIST. The planet's atmosphere has been studied in detail, finding it to be composed mainly of hydrogen and helium, with Rayleigh scattering having been observed. GJ 3470 b is losing mass to its star at a rate of about 10^{10} g/s.

The GJ 3470 planetary system
Companion (in order from star)	Mass	Semimajor axis (AU)	Orbital period (days)	Eccentricity	Inclination (°)	Radius
b / Phailinsiam	11.1±1.0 M_{🜨}	0.0337+0.0014 −0.0011	3.33665240(14)	0.114+0.052 −0.051	89.13+0.26 −0.34	4.35+0.19 −0.15 R_{🜨}

=== Claims of additional planets ===
In July 2020, a group of amateur astronomers reported a new exoplanet candidate in an arXiv preprint, which they hypothesized to be the size of Saturn and inside the system's habitable zone, along with twelve tentative transits from not yet characterized exoplanets in the same star system. If confirmed, GJ 3470 c would become the second exoplanet discovered by amateur astronomers, after KPS-1b, an exoplanet discovered by Ural State Technical University using amateur data. The new GJ 3470 candidate was discovered with amateur data and through a project led by amateur astronomers. The study in question has not been published in any scientific journal, nor has it been peer reviewed.

Similarly, on 21 April 2023, the same group of amateur astronomers reported two new exoplanet candidates co-orbiting, in a horseshoe exchange orbit, close to the star. If confirmed, this would be the first ever discovery of co-orbiting exoplanets. However, again, the study in question is only in preprint form on arXiv, and it has not been peer reviewed and published in a respected scientific journal.

As reported in a follow-up arXiv paper also by amateur astronomers, data from TESS rules out the existence of all three of these claimed planets. Thus, the "transits" observed by the amateur group were likely caused by visual artifacts. Radial velocity data can also rule out planets of the expected mass at the claimed periods, suggesting that if the claimed planets did exist, they would have very low densities.

Unrelated to the previous amateur claims, the results of a search for trojan companions of 95 transiting exoplanets by the TROY project were published in Astronomy & Astrophysics in 2024. One strong candidate was identified by this project - a possible 2.6±0.7 M_{🜨} trojan of GJ 3470 b orbiting at its L5 Lagrange point, based on radial velocity data. However, no transits of this candidate were detected, indicating that if it transits its radius cannot be larger than that of Earth.

== See also ==
- Gliese 436
- GJ 1214
