= GJ 3470 b =

Hot Neptune orbiting GJ 3470

GJ 3470 b / Phailinsiam
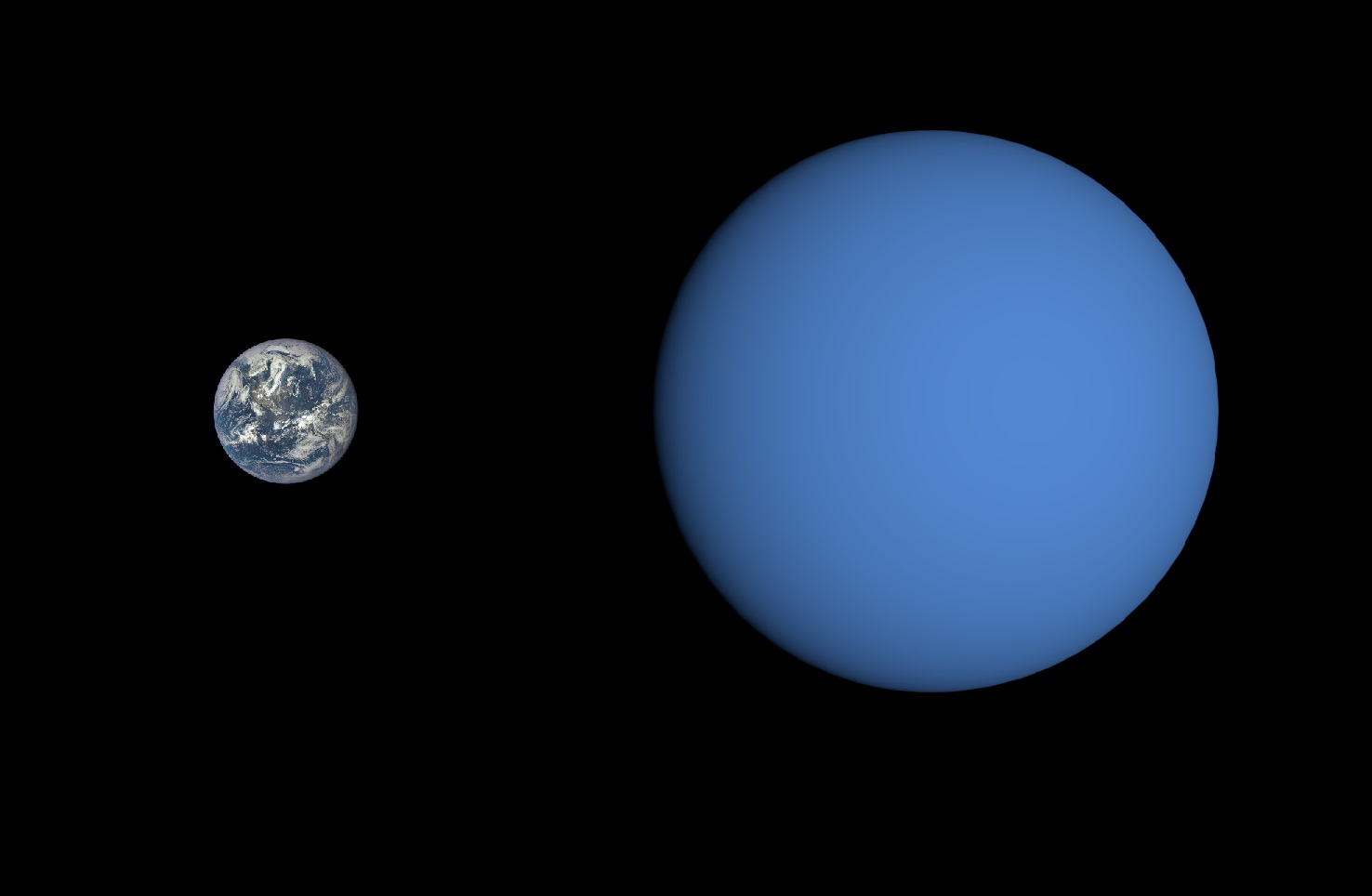
- Size comparison of Phailinsiam with Earth

Discovery
- Discovered by: X. Bonfils et al.
- Discovery date: 2012
- Detection method: Radial velocity

Designations
- Alternative names: Phailinsiam

Orbital characteristics
- Semi-major axis: 0.0337+0.0014 −0.0011 AU
- Eccentricity: 0.114+0.052 −0.051
- Orbital period (sidereal): 3.33665240(14) d
- Inclination: 89.13°+0.26° −0.34°
- Star: GJ 3470

Physical characteristics
- Mean radius: 4.35+0.19 −0.15 R_{🜨}
- Mass: 13.9±1.5 M_{🜨}
- Mean density: 0.80±0.13 g/cm^{3}
- Temperature: 673+10 −13 K

GJ 3470 b (occasionally Gliese 3470 b, formally named Phailinsiam) is an exoplanet orbiting the star GJ 3470, located in the constellation Cancer. With a mass of just under 14 Earth-masses, a radius approximately 4.3 times that of Earth's, and a high equilibrium temperature of 673 K (400 °C; 752 °F), it is a hot Neptune.

The orbit of GJ 3470 b is strongly inclined to the equatorial plane of the parent star, with misalignment equal to 97^{+16}_{−11}°.

== Nomenclature ==
In August 2022, this planet and its host star were included among 20 systems to be named by the third NameExoWorlds project. The approved names, proposed by a team from Thailand, were announced in June 2023. GJ 3470 b is named Phailinsiam and its host star is named Kaewkosin, after the "Siamese Sapphire" and the crystals of Indra in Thai.

== Atmosphere ==
The atmosphere of Phailinsiam is one of the best spectroscopically characterized among all exoplanets.

The exoplanet's atmosphere was first observed by researchers Akihiko Fukui, Norio Narita and Kenji Kuroda at the University of Tokyo in 2013, and afterwards, Fukui commented, "Suppose the atmosphere consists of hydrogen and helium, the mass of the atmosphere would be 5–20% of the total mass of the planet. Comparing that to the fact that the mass of Earth's atmosphere is about one ten-thousandth of a percent (0.0001%) of the total mass of the Earth, this planet has a considerably thick atmosphere." In 2013, by means of Large Binocular Telescope observations, with the LBC Blue and Red cameras, a team reported the detection of Rayleigh scattering in the atmosphere of this planet. In 2015 a team using the Las Cumbres Observatory Global Telescope (LCOGT) network confirmed this finding. In the Las Cumbres researchers' paper published in The Astrophysical Journal, they conclude that the most plausible explanation for the scattering effect to be an atmosphere made predominantly of hydrogen and helium, causing the exoplanet to be veiled by dense clouds and hazes. It is thought that the planet would appear blue to the human eye due to this scattering.

In 2017–2019, the primary hydrogen atmosphere with overall low metallicity, depleted methane and traces of water was characterized. It is likely filling an entire Roche lobe of the planet. In 2019 and 2020, a metastable helium outflow was detected in the atmosphere of Phailinsiam, indicating the atmosphere is currently escaping at a rate of 30,000-100,000 tons per second, or 0.16-0.53 Earth masses per billion years.

In 2024, a team of astronomers led by Thomas Beatty discovered a haze of sulfur dioxide (SO_{2}) in the atmosphere of the exoplanet using JWST observations, indicating active chemical reactions in the atmosphere, likely triggered by radiation from its nearby star. These same observations also clearly measured the presence of methane and carbon dioxide in the atmosphere for the first time, and confirmed that the planet has a high metallicity-atmosphere. These observations also showed that previous claims of Mie-scattering clouds were false.

== Gallery ==
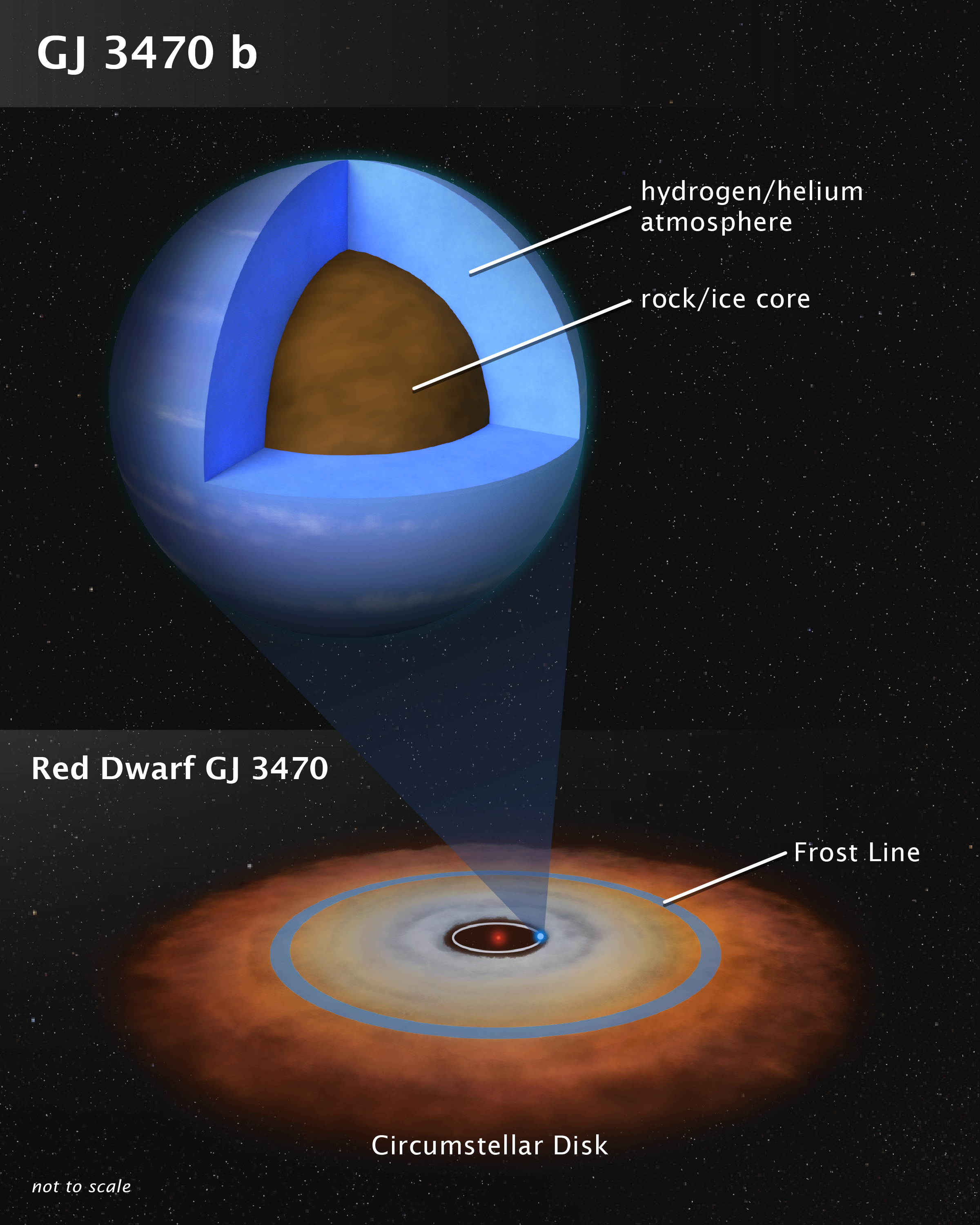
Structure of Exoplanet GJ 3470 b

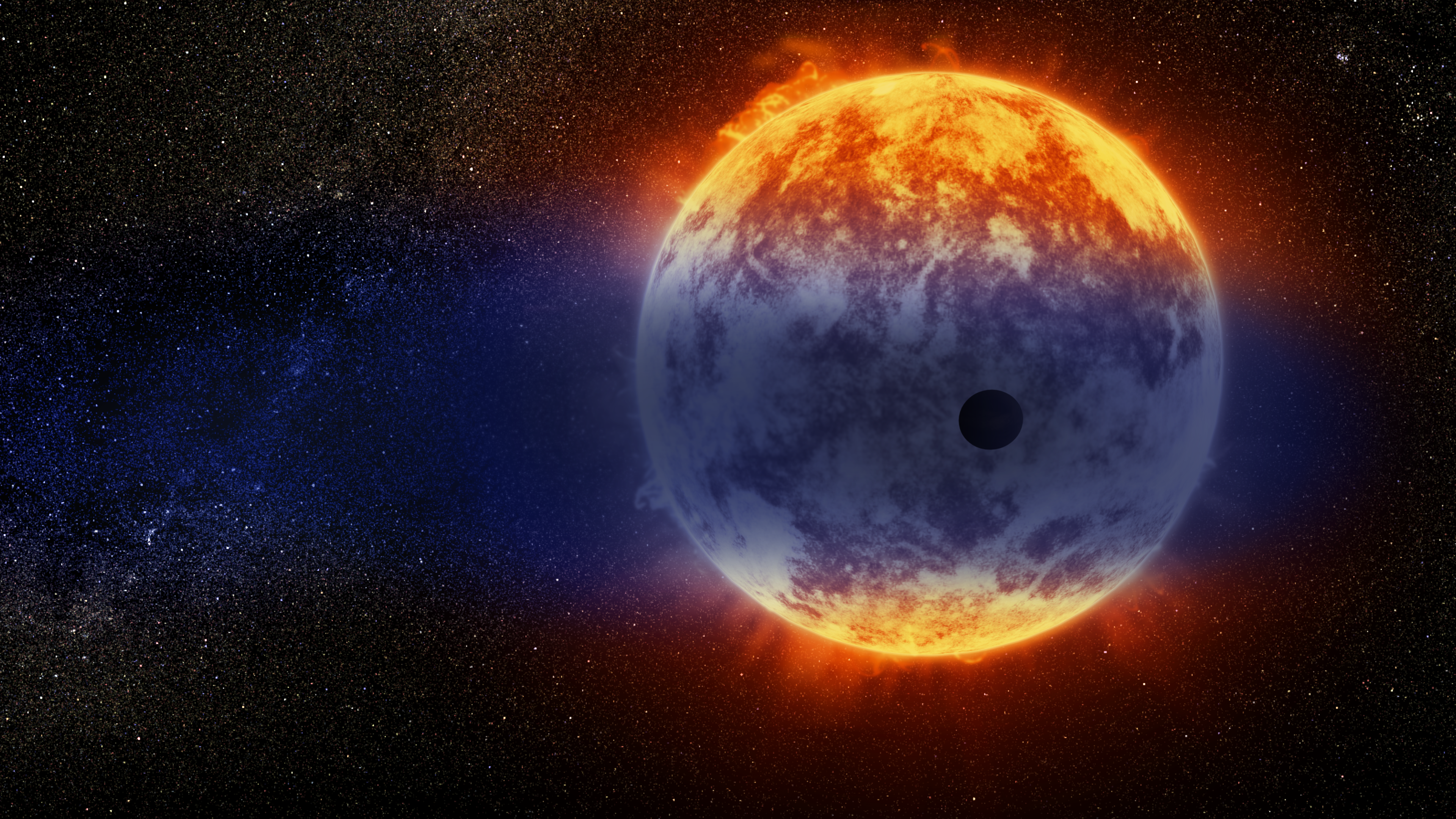
Artist's impression of gas streaming from GJ 3470b

== See also ==
- KELT-9b
- GJ 3470
- Kepler-51
