= Allen Steele =

American journalist and science fiction author (born 1958)

Allen M. Steele
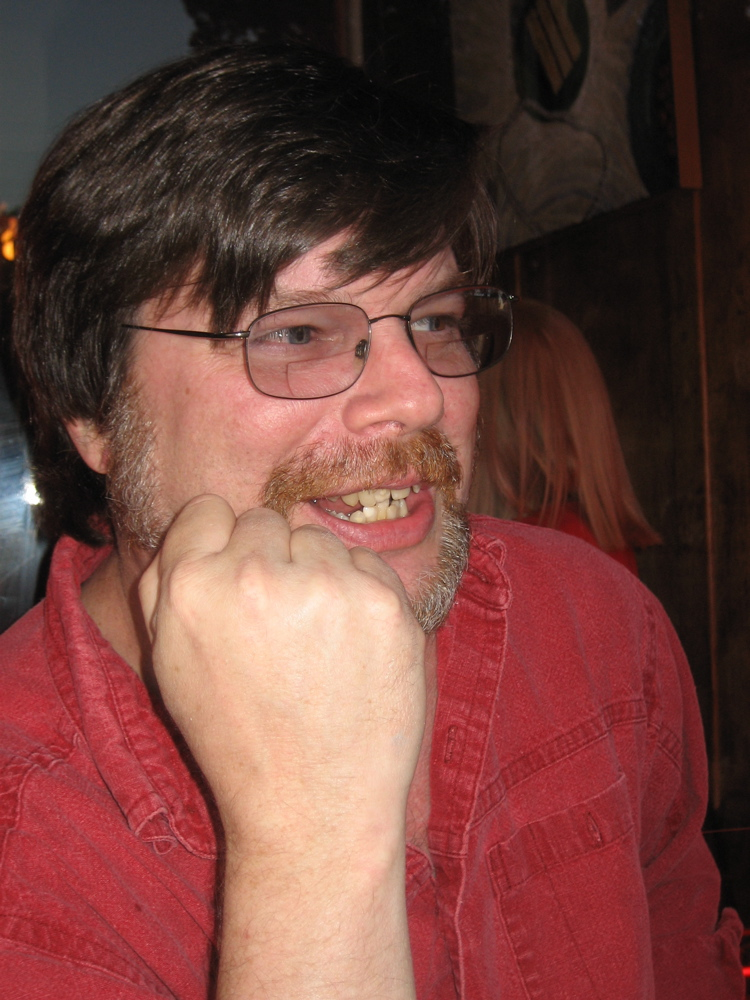
- Steele (2006)
- Born: Allen Mulherin Steele, Jr. January 19, 1958 (age 68); Nashville, Tennessee, U.S.
- Occupations: Novelist; short story author; essayist; journalist
- Writing career
- Genre: Science fiction
- Notable work: Coyote

Allen Mulherin Steele Jr. (born January 19, 1958) is an American journalist and science fiction author.

== Background ==
Steele was born in Nashville, Tennessee, on January 19, 1958. He was introduced to science fiction fandom attending meetings of Nashville's science fiction club. He graduated high school from the Webb School in Bell Buckle, Tennessee, received a bachelor's degree from New England College and a master's from the University of Missouri.

== Writing ==
Before he established himself as a science fiction author, he spent several years working as a journalist. Steele began publishing short stories in 1988. His early novels formed a future history beginning with Orbital Decay and continuing through Labyrinth of Night. Some of his early novels such as Orbital Decay and Lunar Descent were about blue-collar workers working on future construction projects in space. Since 1992, he has tended to focus on stand-alone projects and short stories, although he has written five novels about the moon Coyote.

Steele serves on the Board of Advisors for both the Space Frontier Foundation and the Science Fiction and Fantasy Writers of America, and he is a former member (Eastern Regional Director) of the SFWA Board of Directors. In April 2001, he testified before the Subcommittee on Space and Aeronautics of the U.S. House of Representatives, in hearings regarding space exploration in the 21st century.

In 2004, he contributed a chapter to the collaborative hoax novel, Atlanta Nights.

== Awards ==
Allen Steele received several awards for his writing:

- 1990: Locus Award for Orbital Decay
- 1996: Hugo Award for "The Death of Captain Future"
- 1997: Locus Award for "'... Where Angels Fear to Tread'"
- 1997: Science Fiction Chronicle Readers Award for "'... Where Angels Fear to Tread'"
- 1998: Hugo Award for "'... Where Angels Fear to Tread'"
- 1998: Seiun Award for "The Death of Captain Future"
- 2002: Asimov's Readers' Award for "Stealing Alabama"
- 2005: Asimov's Readers' Award for "The Garcia Narrows Bridge"
- 2011: Hugo Award for "The Emperor of Mars"
- 2013: Seiun Award for "The Emperor of Mars"
- 2013: Robert A. Heinlein Award (together with Yoji Kondo)
- 2014: Asimov's Readers' Award for "The Legion of Tomorrow"

== Bibliography ==
=== Novels ===
- The Jericho Iteration. 1994.
- The Tranquillity Alternative (1996)
- Oceanspace (2000)
- Chronospace (2001) Re-released for Kindle under the Author's preferred title, Time Loves a Hero
- Apollo's Outcasts (2012)
- V-S Day (2014)
- Arkwright (2016)
- Sanctuary (2020)

Near-Space series
also called Rude Astronauts series

- Orbital Decay (1989)
- Clarke County, Space (1990)
- Lunar Descent (1991)
- Labyrinth of Night (1992)
- A King of Infinite Space (1997)

Coyote series

- Coyote Trilogy
  - Coyote: A Novel of Interstellar Exploration (2002)
  - Coyote Rising: A Novel of Interstellar Revolution (2004)
  - Coyote Frontier: A Novel of Interstellar Colonization (2005)
- Coyote Chronicles
  - Coyote Horizon (2009)
  - Coyote Destiny (2010) (Note: Allen Steele Announces New Coyote Books, CoyoteSeries.com, 2008-05-16)
- Coyote Universe
  - Spindrift (2007)
  - Galaxy Blues (2008)
  - Hex (2011) (Note: Coyote Destiny: Allen Steele’s great space colonization series continues, Tor.com (and comments by author in Coyote Destiny introduction), 2010-02-26)

Captain Future series

- Avengers of the Moon (2017)
- The Return of Ul Quorn, Book I: Captain Future in Love (2019)
- The Return of Ul Quorn, Book II: The Guns of Pluto (2020)
- The Return of Ul Quorn, Book III: 1,500 Light Years From Home (2021)
- The Return of Ul Quorn, Book IV: The Horror at Jupiter (2021)
- Lost Apollo (2024)
- The Multiverse War (TBP)

=== Chapbooks ===
- The Weight (1995)
- The Days Between (2002)
- The River Horses (2007)
- Angel of Europa (2011)

=== Short fiction ===
Collections

- Rude Astronauts (1992)
- All-American Alien Boy (1996)
- Sex and Violence in Zero-G: The Complete Near-Space Stories (1998)
- American Beauty (2003)
- The Last Science Fiction Writer (2008)
- Tales of Time and Space. Fantastic Books.

Stories

Title	Year	First published	Reprinted/collected	Notes
John Harper Wilson	1989	Steele, Allen M. (June 1989). "John Harper Wilson". Asimov's Science Fiction. 13 (6): 78–91.		
Goddard's People	1991	Asimov's Science Fiction, July 1991		
Riders in the Sky	1994	Alternate Outlaws edited by Mike Resnick		
The Death of Captain Future	1995	Asimov's Science Fiction, October 1995	Dozois, Gardner, ed. (1996). The year's best science fiction : thirteenth annual collection. St Martin's Griffin.	
'... Where Angels Fear to Tread'	1997			
The Emperor of Mars	2010	Asimov's Science Fiction, June 2010	Dozois, Gardner, ed. (2011). The mammoth book of best new SF 24. Robinson.	
Sixteen Million Leagues from Versailles	2013	"Sixteen million leagues from Versailles". Analog. 133 (10): 8–22. October 2013.		
Martian Blood	2013	Dozois, Gardner; Martin, George R R, eds. (2013). Old Mars. Bantam Books.	Dozois, Gardner, ed. (2014). The year's best science fiction : thirty-first annual collection. St Martin's Griffin.; Dozois, Gardner, ed. (2014). The mammoth book of best new SF 27. Robinson.	
The Legion of Tomorrow	2014	Steele, Allen M. (July 2014). "The Legion of Tomorrow". Asimov's Science Fiction. 38 (7): 70–102.		
The Prodigal Son	2014	Steele, Allen M. (October–November 2014). "The prodigal son". Asimov's Science Fiction. 38 (10–11): 150–181.		Novella
Frogheads	2015	Dozois, Gardner; Martin, George R R, eds. (2015). Old Venus. Bantam Books.		
The long wait	2015	Steele, Allen M. (January 2015). "The long wait". Asimov's Science Fiction. 39 (1): 70–100.		Novella
Starship Mountain	2018	Steele, Allen M. (July–August 2018). "Starship Mountain". Asimov's Science Fiction.		
The Lost Testament	2019	Steele, Allen M. (March–April 2019). "The Lost Testament". Asimov's Science Fiction.		

=== Non-fiction ===
- Primary Ignition (2003) includes articles and essays from 1997 to 2004
- Steele, Allen M. (September 2014). "Tomorrow Through the Past". Thought Experiment. Asimov's Science Fiction. 38 (9): 10–16.

=== Critical studies and reviews of Steele's work ===
Arkwright

- Sakers, Don (April 2016). "The Reference Library". Analog Science Fiction and Fact. 136 (4): 105–108.

Tales of Time and Space

- Sakers, Don (July–August 2015). "The Reference Library". Analog Science Fiction and Fact. 135 (7&8): 185–188.

———————
