= Debra Fischer =

American astronomer and academic

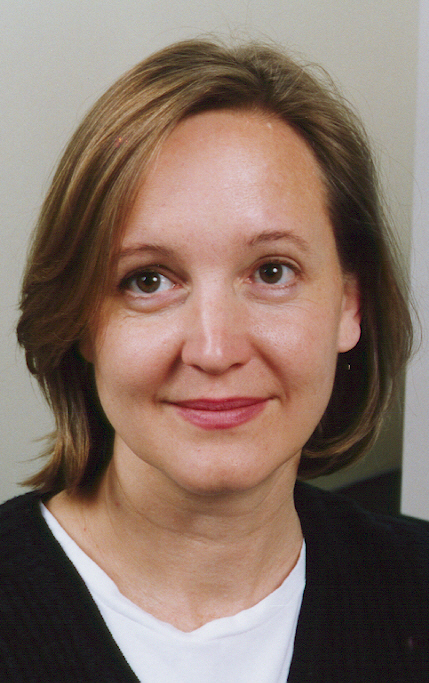
- Fischer in 2004
- Born: 1953 (age 72–73)
- Education: University of Iowa, San Francisco State University, University of California, Santa Cruz
- Known for: Astronomy, Exoplanetology
- Scientific career
- Fields: Astronomy
- Workplaces: Yale University

Debra Ann Fischer (born 1953) is an American astronomer and professor emerita at Yale University. She is known for her work in the discovery and characterization of exoplanets using the radial velocity method.

Fischer has been involved in the detection of hundreds of exoplanets and has contributed to the development of high-precision spectrographs used in exoplanet research.

== Early life and education ==
Fischer received her degree in nursing from the University of Iowa in 1975, a masters of science in physics from San Francisco State University in 1992, and her PhD in astrophysics from the University of California, Santa Cruz in 1998.

== Career and research ==
Following her PhD, Fischer worked as a postdoctoral researcher at the University of California, Berkeley. She was a faculty member at San Francisco State University from 2003 to 2008 before joining Yale University in 2009. She was a Fellow at the Radcliffe Institute for Advanced Study from 2009 – 2010.

At Yale, Fischer held a primary appointment in Astronomy, and secondary appointments in Earth & Planetary Sciences, and Statistics & Data Science. Fischer served as Dean of Academic Affairs from 2018 to 2021. Fischer served as Division Director of Astronomy at the National Science Foundation from 2021 - 2023.

Fischer began exoplanet research in 1997 using Doppler spectroscopy and was part of the team that discovered the first known multi-planet system around the star Upsilon Andromedae in 1999.

She quantified a correlation between the chemical composition of host stars and the formation of orbiting gas giant planets.

She co-led the N2K Consortium with Gregory Laughlin, detecting dozens of exoplanets around metal-rich stars at Keck Observatory, the Subaru telescope and the Magellan Telescopes.

Fischer was the principal investigator for the CHIRON spectrograph at CTIO, VUES at Vilnius University, and EXPRES at the Lowell Discovery Telescope. These instruments aim to improve measurement precision in radial velocity studies to enable the detection of small amplitude radial velocity signals from rocky planets.

In 2010 with the Oxford Zooniverse team, Fischer co‑founded Planet Hunters, a citizen science project for exoplanet discovery. In 2019, she co-founded Astronomers for Planet Earth, an international initiative aimed at mobilizing the astronomy community in addressing climate change. As Division Director of Astronomy at NSF, she emphasized sustainability in scientific operations and the importance of preparing energy budgets for research facilities.

== Honors and awards ==
- 2002 Carl Sagan Award, American Astronautical Society
- 2009 Radcliffe Institute Fellow: Sept 2009 – June 2010
- Elected to the Connecticut Academy of Science and Engineering (2010)
- Elected Member of the American Academy of Arts and Sciences (2012)
- 2016 Hall of Fame Inductee the San Francisco State University
- 2020 Elected a Legacy Fellow of the American Astronomical Society
- 2021 class of Fellows of the American Association for the Advancement of Science
- 2021 Elected Member of the National Academy of Sciences

== Selected publications ==
- Borucki, William J.; Koch, David; Basri, Gibor; Batalha, Natalie; Brown, Timothy; Caldwell, Douglas; Caldwell, John; Christensen-Dalsgaard, Jørgen; Cochran, William D.; DeVore, Edna; Dunham, Edward W.; Dupree, Andrea K.; Gautier, Thomas N.; Geary, John C.; Gilliland, Ronald (2010-02-19). "Kepler Planet-Detection Mission: Introduction and First Results". Science. 327 (5968): 977–980. Bibcode:2010Sci...327..977B. doi:10.1126/science.1185402. PMID 20056856.
- Fischer, Debra A.; Valenti, Jeff (2005). "The Planet-Metallicity Correlation". The Astrophysical Journal. 622 (2): 1102–1117. Bibcode:2005ApJ...622.1102F. doi:10.1086/428383. ISSN 0004-637X.
- Valenti, Jeff A.; Fischer, Debra A. (2005). "Spectroscopic Properties of Cool Stars (SPOCS). I. 1040 F, G, and K Dwarfs from Keck, Lick, and AAT Planet Search Programs". The Astrophysical Journal Supplement Series. 159 (1): 141–166. Bibcode:2005ApJS..159..141V. doi:10.1086/430500. ISSN 0067-0049.
- Howard, Andrew W.; Marcy, Geoffrey W.; Bryson, Stephen T.; Jenkins, Jon M.; Rowe, Jason F.; Batalha, Natalie M.; Borucki, William J.; Koch, David G.; Dunham, Edward W.; Gautier, Thomas N.; Van Cleve, Jeffrey; Cochran, William D.; Latham, David W.; Lissauer, Jack J.; Torres, Guillermo (2012). "Planet Occurrence within 0.25 AU of Solar-type Stars from Kepler". The Astrophysical Journal Supplement Series. 201 (2): 15. arXiv:1103.2541. Bibcode:2012ApJS..201...15H. doi:10.1088/0067-0049/201/2/15. ISSN 0067-0049.
- Butler, R. P.; Wright, J. T.; Marcy, G. W.; Fischer, D. A.; Vogt, S. S.; Tinney, C. G.; Jones, H. R. A.; Carter, B. D.; Johnson, J. A.; McCarthy, C.; Penny, A. J. (2006-07-20). "Catalog of Nearby Exoplanets". The Astrophysical Journal. 646 (1): 505–522. arXiv:astro-ph/0607493. Bibcode:2006ApJ...646..505B. doi:10.1086/504701. ISSN 0004-637X.
- Cumming, Andrew; Butler, R. Paul; Marcy, Geoffrey W.; Vogt, Steven S.; Wright, Jason T.; Fischer, Debra A. (2008). "The Keck Planet Search: Detectability and the Minimum Mass and Orbital Period Distribution of Extrasolar Planets". Publications of the Astronomical Society of the Pacific. 120 (867): 531–554. arXiv:0803.3357. Bibcode:2008PASP..120..531C. doi:10.1086/588487. ISSN 0004-6280.
- Isaacson, Howard; Fischer, Debra (2010-11-22). "Chromospheric Activity and Jitter Measurements for 2630 Stars on the California Planet Search". The Astrophysical Journal. 725 (1): 875–885. arXiv:1009.2301. Bibcode:2010ApJ...725..875I. doi:10.1088/0004-637x/725/1/875. ISSN 0004-637X.
- Wang, Ji; Fischer, Debra A. (2015-01-01). "REVEALING A UNIVERSAL PLANET–METALLICITY CORRELATION FOR PLANETS OF DIFFERENT SIZES AROUND SOLAR-TYPE STARS". The Astronomical Journal. 149 (1): 14. arXiv:1310.7830. Bibcode:2015AJ....149...14W. doi:10.1088/0004-6256/149/1/14. ISSN 0004-6256.
- Brewer, John M.; Fischer, Debra A.; Valenti, Jeff A.; Piskunov, Nikolai (2016-08-01). "Spectral Properties of Cool Stars: Extended Abundance Analysis of 1,617 Planet-Search Stars". The Astrophysical Journal Supplement Series. 225 (2): 32. arXiv:1606.07929. Bibcode:2016ApJS..225...32B. doi:10.3847/0067-0049/225/2/32. ISSN 0067-0049.
