= 2026 in science =

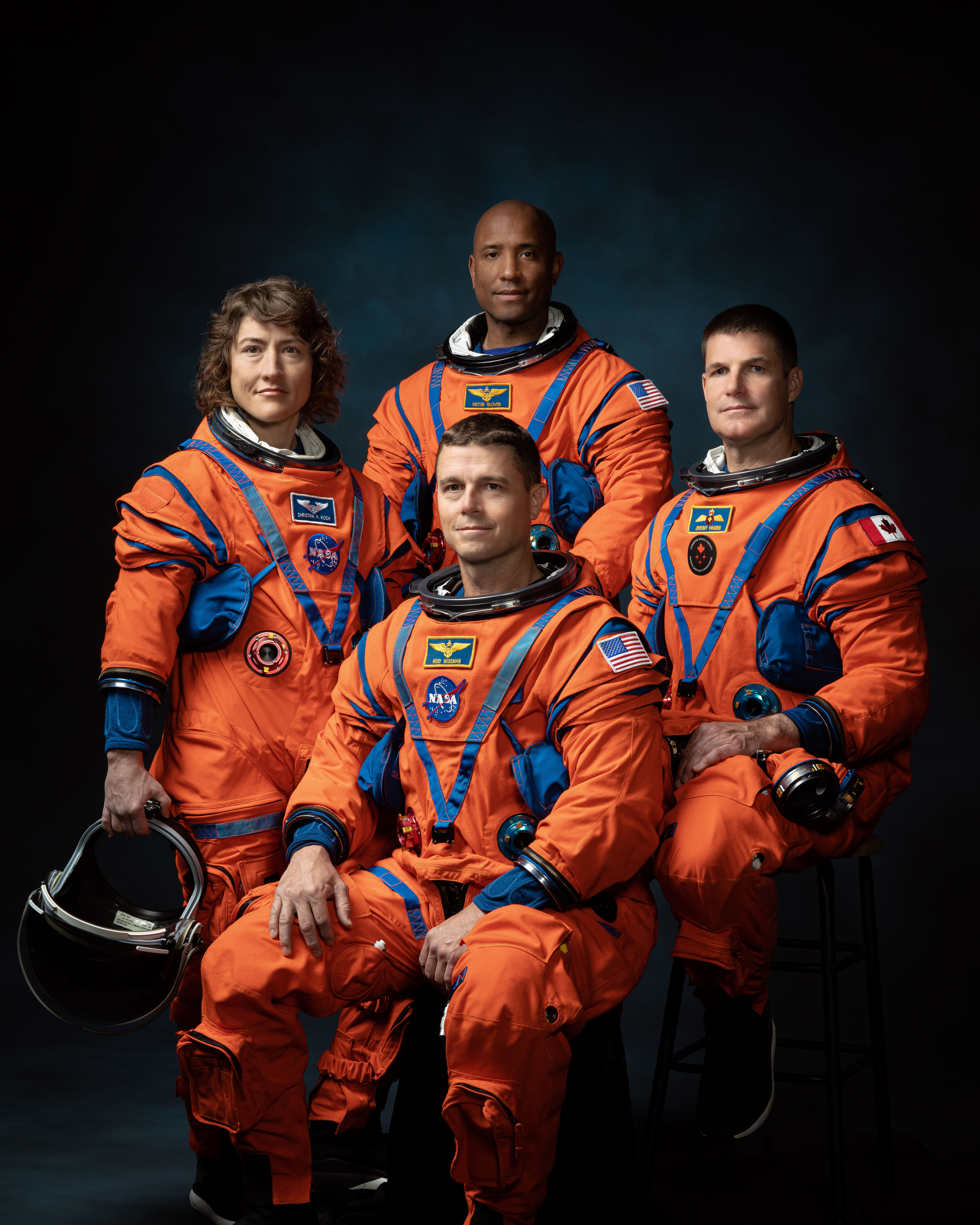
The crew of Artemis II

This article lists notable scientific events and developments that occurred in 2026.

== Events ==
=== January ===
- 1 January
  - Researchers operating China's Experimental Advanced Superconducting Tokamak (EAST) report the first experimental verification of a theorised density-free plasma operating regime, achieving stable electron densities approximately 1.3–1.65 times the Greenwald limit.
  - Researchers at the Korea Advanced Institute of Science and Technology report a photo-Hall (Hall effect)–based method for detecting semiconductor electronic trap states with approximately 1,000-fold greater sensitivity than existing techniques.
- 2 January – Researchers at the Vienna University of Technology and the Okinawa Institute of Science and Technology demonstrate self-sustained superradiant microwave emission, produced by interacting spins in diamond, offering potential applications in quantum communication and sensing.
- 7 January – Astronomers using data from the Vera C. Rubin Observatory report that 2025 MN_{45} has the fastest spin of any known asteroid larger than 0.5 km (0.31 mi) in diameter, completing one rotation every 1.88 minutes.
- 10 January - Axiom Mission : 4 launches from Kennedy Space Center, carrying ISRO Astronaut Shubhanshu Shukla to the International Space Station (ISS)
- 13 January
  - Paleoanthropologists publish a complete analysis of KNM-ER 64061, the most complete known skeleton of Homo habilis, discovered in 2012 in Kenya.
- 14 January
  - Researchers report the discovery of a new quantum state, bridging the gap between quantum criticality and quantum topology via semimetal CeRu_{4}Sn_{6}.
  - Researchers led by the University of the Chinese Academy of Sciences report the first direct experimental observation of the Migdal effect, a quantum process in which a recoiling atomic nucleus ejects an electron, confirming a prediction made in 1939 and enabling new approaches to searches for light dark matter.
  - Researchers from the University of Copenhagen publish a Nature paper explaining little red dots as young and relatively small supermassive black holes enshrouded in a dense cocoon of ionized gas.
  - The Ice Memory Foundation opens its ice core archive at Concordia Station in Antarctica, storing the first samples from glaciers on Grand Combin, Switzerland and Mont Blanc, France. The samples travelled from Trieste for more than 50 days aboard the Italian icebreaker Laura Bassi.
  - The European Copernicus Climate Change Service reports that 2025 was the world's third hottest year on record (2024 was the hottest year and 2023 the second hottest). In Antarctica, the average annual temperature was the warmest since measurements began and in the Arctic, it was the second highest.
- 19 January
  - The first known example of multi-purpose tool use by a cow is reported, with a Brown Swiss named Veronika using both ends of a stick to scratch her own back.
  - Researchers at the University of California, Davis, develop a machine learning-augmented spectrometer-on-a-chip capable of real-time hyperspectral sensing across the visible and near-infrared range, enabling compact alternatives to conventional laboratory spectrometers.
- 23 January – The largest interstellar organosulfur molecule (2.5-cyclohexadiene-1-thione) so far is identified in a molecular cloud about 27,000 light-years from Earth near the Galactic Center.
- 24 January – AES Andes abandons the INNA project to produce hydrogen and ammonia in Chile criticised for its potentially negative impact on astronomical observations at Paranal Observatory and Extremely Large Telescope.
- 27 January – HD 137010 b, a cool Earth-sized transiting exoplanet candidate 146 light years away, orbiting near the outer edge of its star's habitable zone, is discovered in Kepler K2 data from 2017.
- 28 January – Researchers at Google DeepMind publish a study on AlphaGenome, a deep learning model that predicts the functional effects of genetic variants across multiple regulatory modalities from long DNA sequences, improving interpretation of non-coding regions of the genome.

=== February ===
- 12 February
  - Using observations by ESA's CHEOPS telescope, scientists describe a unique configuration of a planetary system around the star LHS 1903, where the innermost and outermost planets are rocky, while the two middle planets have extended atmospheres. This provides support for the "inside-out" model of planet formation.
  - A small polymerase ribozyme is described which can synthesize both its complementary strand and a copy of itself. This is interpreted as a substantial support for the "RNA world" hypothesis of the origin of life.
  - Researchers at Iceberg Quantum publish a study describing the "Pinnacle Architecture", a fault-tolerant quantum computing design based on quantum low-density parity-check (qLDPC) codes. They show that a 2048-bit RSA integer could be factored with fewer than 100,000 physical qubits under standard hardware assumptions – an order-of-magnitude reduction compared to previous estimates.
  - 14 February - Scientists at Experimental Advanced Superconducting Tokamak (EAST) achieve a record Density - free plasma confinement regime for fusion energy.
- 24 February – Researchers in Switzerland report that centenarians show "youthful" blood profiles across 37 proteins, including markedly lower oxidative stress markers, suggesting that specific aging-related biological pathways are slowed in exceptional longevity.
- 26 February – Researchers in Australia report that serum bicarbonate levels in U.S. population data have risen by 7% since 1999, tracking increases in atmospheric carbon dioxide. Modelling suggests that, if current trends continue, average bicarbonate levels could approach the upper limit of today's accepted healthy range within 50 years.

=== March ===
- 6 March
  - Astronomers report the discovery of GJ 887 d, a super-Earth exoplanet orbiting the nearby red dwarf star GJ 887. Detected using radial velocity measurements, the planet lies within the star's habitable zone. At just 10.7 light-years, this becomes the second-nearest known exoplanet in the habitable zone after Proxima Centauri b.
  - The UK's first long‑distance robotic-assisted surgery is reported to have been performed on a patient located 1,500 miles (2,400km) away in Gibraltar.
- 9 March – A study published in Geophysical Research Letters reports with statistical confidence that global warming has accelerated since around 2015, with the rate of increase rising from 0.2 °C to about 0.35 °C per decade after accounting for natural variability. The findings suggest the 1.5 °C threshold could be reached before 2030 if current trends continue.
- 10 March – A study by Vattenfall and Spoor using AI-assisted video monitoring of 2,007 bird flight paths near an offshore turbine at Aberdeen Bay over 19 months reports no confirmed collisions, with observed avoidance behaviour suggesting lower-than-expected impacts of wind turbines on seabirds.
- 11 March
  - Two separate studies, published in Environmental Research Letters and Nature Communications, show how net negative emissions will need to be sustained for centuries to stabilise global climate change.
  - Astronomers report evidence of a likely collision between two planets orbiting the star Gaia20ehk, about 11,000 light years away in the constellation Puppis. Erratic dimming and strong infrared emission are attributed to hot debris produced by the impact passing in front of the star.
- 12 March – An international team reports the first direct measurements of the nanomechanical properties of lithium dendrites, microscopic needle-like structures that can form inside lithium batteries and cause them to short circuit or catch fire. The study finds that dendrites are strengthened by a solid electrolyte interphase layer, making them brittle and capable of penetrating battery separators, providing new insight into battery degradation and safety risks.
- 17 March – Physicists at CERN's LHCb experiment report the discovery of the doubly charmed baryon Ξcc⁺. The particle, containing two charm quarks and one down quark, is detected with high statistical significance and resolves a long-standing discrepancy from earlier experimental results.
- 18 March – Charles H. Bennett and Gilles Brassard are awarded the 2025 Turing Award for their work in quantum information science.
- 20 March – Scientists from Great Ormond Street Hospital and University College London report the creation of the first lab‑grown oesophagus, and show it can safely replace a full section of the organ and restore normal function, including swallowing, in a growing animal without the need for immunosuppression.
- 24 March
  - Antimatter particles are transported by road for the first time, to assess their stability during transit. An estimated 100 to 1,000 antiprotons are carried in a Penning trap across a distance of five kilometres in Switzerland.
  - A 20-year Japanese study published in Nature Communications reports that repeated cloning of laboratory mice from a single donor could not continue beyond 58 generations, after large structural and lethal DNA mutations accumulated and birth rates declined from the 27th generation.
- 25 March – Astronomers identify a shortlist of 45 nearby exoplanets as the most promising candidates for habitability, based on their size, composition, and location within their stars' habitable zones. The catalogue is intended to guide future observations by next-generation telescopes in the search for biosignatures and extraterrestrial life.
- 27 March – Researchers led by the University of Oxford report a synthetic biology approach to improving honeybee nutrition, engineering yeast to produce essential sterols missing from modern diets. Colonies fed the supplement produce up to 15 times more developing young.

=== April ===
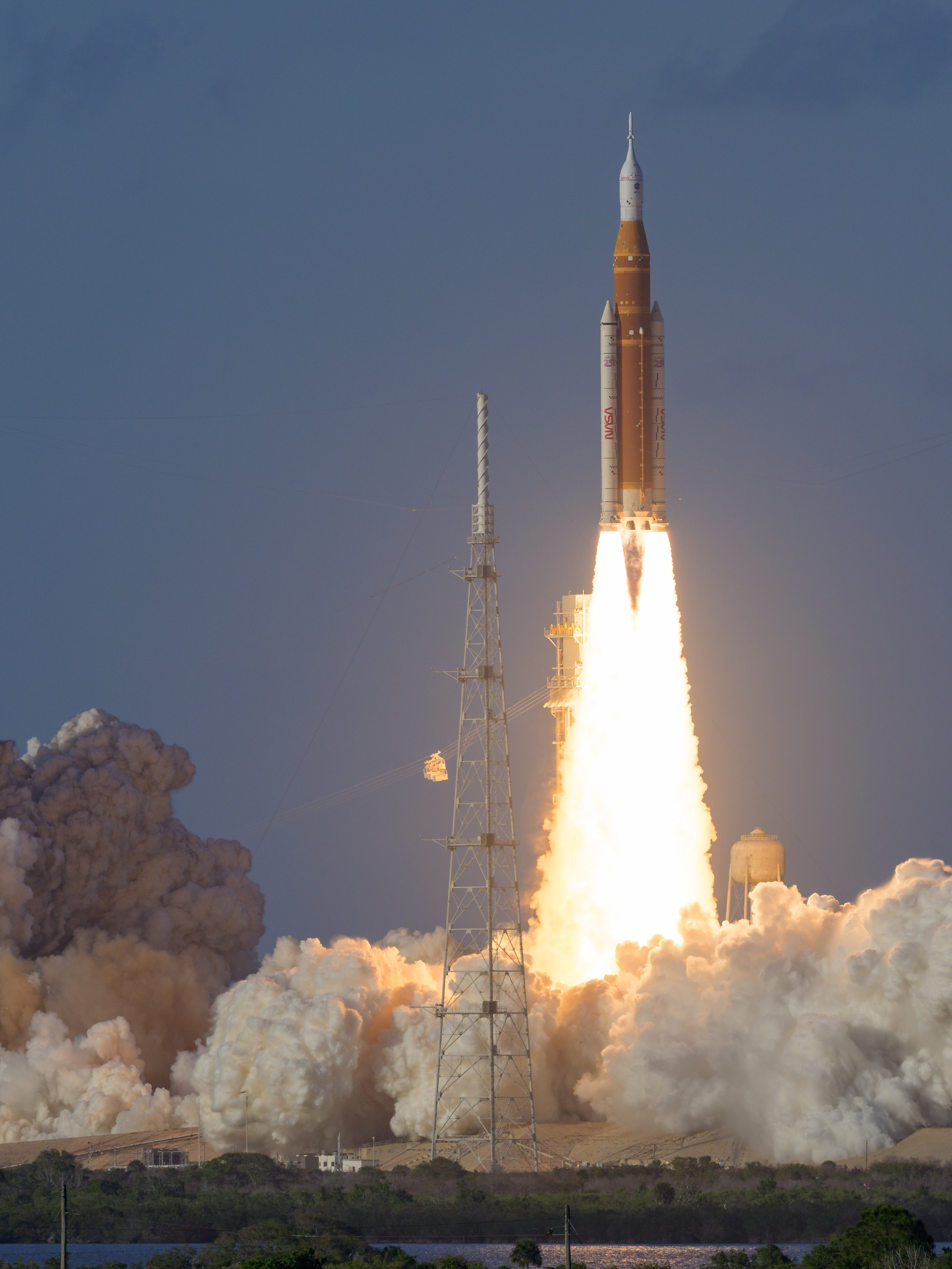
1 April: Artemis II blasts off toward the Moon for its lunar flyby, carrying a crew of four.

- 1 April – Artemis program: NASA launches the Artemis II lunar flyby mission from Launch Complex 39B at the Kennedy Space Center in Florida, the first crewed flight beyond low Earth orbit since Apollo 17 in 1972. With a crew of four astronauts – Reid Wiseman (Commander) Victor Glover (Pilot), Christina Koch (Mission specialist), and Canadian astronaut Jeremy Hansen (Mission specialist) – it also becomes the first time a person of color, a woman, and a non-United States citizen have left low Earth orbit. It passed around the Moon's far side on 6 April.
- 2 April
  - Scientists describe a transitional fauna of the late Ediacaran from Yunnan in China, which fills a gap between ancestors of modern phyla and larger multicellular life.
  - Astronomers using preliminary data from the Vera C. Rubin Observatory announce the discovery of over 11,000 new asteroids, including hundreds of trans-Neptunian objects and 33 previously unknown near-Earth objects. The detections are confirmed by the Minor Planet Center.
- 6 April – In a landmark achievement for India's nuclear energy programme, the 500 MWe Prototype Fast Breeder Reactor successfully attains first criticality (start of controlled fission chain reaction).
- 6 April – The crew of Artemis II breaks the record for the furthest humans have ever been from Earth, reaching a maximum distance of 252,757 miles (406,773 km) as they travel around the far side of the Moon.
- 8 April
  - A systematic review and meta-analysis published in PLOS ONE reports that regular physical activity is associated with a 25% lower risk of dementia, while prolonged sedentary behaviour (more than 8 hours of sitting per day) is associated with a 27% higher risk. Sleeping less than 7 hours or more than 8 hours per night is likewise linked to increased dementia risk.
  - Blue Origin reports that its "Air Pioneer" reactor has extracted oxygen from melted lunar regolith simulant, yielding medical- and propellant-grade oxygen via purification of gases released during electrolysis. The system is being developed as part of the company's in situ resource use efforts for sustainable lunar exploration.
- 9 April – The first non-mammalian synapsid fossil embryo belonging to Lystrosaurus is described, confirming the hypothesis that mammal ancestors laid eggs.
- 13 April – A study published in the Journal of Competition Law & Economics finds that AI-driven personalised pricing could allow firms to charge different prices to individual consumers based on predicted willingness to pay, raising concerns about transparency, fairness, and potential abuse of dominant market positions under EU and UK competition law.
- 15 April – A study published in Science Advances finds that the Atlantic meridional overturning circulation (AMOC) is likely to weaken by 42–58% by 2100, significantly more than many previous estimates, with the most realistic climate models indicating a high probability of eventual collapse. The research reduces uncertainty by combining observational data with model projections, suggesting that stronger slowdown scenarios are more consistent with real-world conditions. Scientists warn that such a decline could have major impacts on global climate systems, including shifts in rainfall patterns, rising sea levels in the Atlantic, and extreme weather changes in Europe and other regions.
- 16 April
  - A study in the Journal of Geophysical Research: Planets presents "PlanetWaves", a model developed by researchers at MIT to predict wave formation under different planetary conditions. The results suggest that wave behaviour varies widely depending on gravity, atmosphere, and liquid composition, with gentle winds potentially generating large waves on Titan but only small ripples on denser or higher-gravity worlds.
  - A Cochrane systematic review of 17 clinical trials involving 20,342 participants concludes that amyloid beta-targeting monoclonal antibody treatments provide, on average, little or no clinically meaningful improvement in cognition or dementia severity among people with early Alzheimer's disease, while increasing the risk of brain swelling. Some experts question whether the pooled findings adequately represent individual drugs, given differences between the antibodies studied.
- 17 April – A cohort study published in The Journal of Nutrition reports an association between egg consumption and a lower incidence of Alzheimer's disease among older adults. Participants who consumed eggs at least five times per week had a 27% lower observed risk than those who rarely or never ate eggs, after adjustment for measured demographic, lifestyle and health factors. The observational study does not establish a causal relationship.
- 21 April – The discovery of seven previously undetected organic molecules (trimethylbenzene, tetramethylbenzene, methyl benzoate, dihydronaphthalene, naphthalene, benzothiophene and methylnaphthalene) on Mars by the Curiosity rover is announced.
- 28 April – Astronomers using data from the Transiting Exoplanet Survey Satellite report 11,554 exoplanet candidates, including 10,091 new candidates, from a machine-learning-assisted search of 83.7 million stellar light curves. One candidate, TIC 183374187 b, is confirmed as a hot Jupiter.

=== May ===
- 3 May – Astronomers from the University of Warwick report 118 new confirmed exoplanets, with a further 2,000 "high-quality" candidates, detected using machine learning applied to data from NASA's Transiting Exoplanet Survey Satellite (TESS).
- 4 May
  - The discovery of a thin atmosphere on the trans-Neptunian object (612533) 2002 XV_{93} is announced.
  - A study published in Communications Sustainability finds that utility-scale solar power and wind power generally provide greater climate and public health benefits per dollar than direct air capture (DAC), based on modelling across 22 U.S. grid regions through 2050. The authors conclude that DAC becomes competitive mainly under a breakthrough scenario in which energy use falls from 5,500 to 800 kWh and cost from US$1,000 to US$100 per tonne of CO_{2} captured.
- 6 May – A study in npj Space Exploration, using radar data from India's Chandrayaan-2 orbiter, reports strong evidence for subsurface water ice in four doubly-shadowed craters near the lunar south pole.
- 8 May – A study published in Aging Cell reports that the exceptional-longevity-associated APOE ε2 allele is associated with enhanced DNA-damage response and repair pathways in human neurons. Using stem-cell-derived GABAergic and glutamatergic neurons, as well as human APOE knock-in mice, researchers find that APOE2 neurons show lower DNA damage and greater resistance to genotoxic-stress-induced cellular senescence than APOE4 neurons, suggesting a possible mechanism for APOE2's association with reduced Alzheimer's disease risk.
- 12 May – A study published in Frontiers in Earth Science reports isotopic evidence from helium and carbon in hydrothermal fluids from Zambia's Kafue Rift, suggesting early-stage rifting in the proposed Southwestern Rift of Africa. The findings indicate mantle-derived fluids reaching the surface and may support the existence of an emerging plate boundary capable of future continental separation.
- 26 May – A preprint reports the atomically precise mechanosynthesis of carbon structures on hydrogenated silicon using inverted-mode scanning tunneling microscopy (STM). Researchers demonstrate controlled donation of C_{2} units to pre-patterned reactive sites, repeated placement of carbon units, and stepwise formation of polyyne-like carbon chains through successive C–C bond formation, suggesting a possible route toward programmable atomically precise fabrication.
- 27 May – A study published in Light: Science & Applications describes an additive-free, brine-discharge-free solar-thermal desalination method that uses femtosecond laser-etched superwicking black metal to produce fresh water from real ocean water while collecting nearly all remaining salts as solids. Tests using samples from the Pacific, Atlantic, and Indian Oceans show that the self-cleaning surface can prevent salt and mineral build-up, a major limitation of existing solar desalination systems.
- 31 May – A Phase 3 trial published in the New England Journal of Medicine reports that daraxonrasib, an investigational oral RAS(ON) inhibitor, nearly doubles median overall survival in patients with previously treated metastatic pancreatic cancer, from 6.6 months with standard chemotherapy to 13.2 months.

=== June ===
- 1 June – A bioRxiv preprint reports the first use of base editing to alter the genome of early human embryos. Researchers at Columbia University used the technique to introduce precise single-letter DNA changes without the large chromosomal alterations previously associated with double-strand-break CRISPR gene editing, while noting that the approach remains far from clinical use and raises ethical questions over human germline engineering.
- 3 June – A report by the United Nations University Institute for Water, Environment and Health estimates that global data centre electricity consumption could reach 945 TWh by 2030, driven partly by growing demand for artificial intelligence, with associated water use rising to 9.3 trillion litres and carbon dioxide emissions to 399 million tonnes.
- 4 June – A study published in Nature Physics reports evidence from molecular dynamics simulations supporting the existence of two distinct, interconvertible local structures in liquid water. The researchers used unsupervised learning to analyse simulated molecular behaviour, lending support to the long-standing two-state model of water, which has been proposed to explain some of water's unusual physical properties.
- 5 June – Researchers at the University of Cambridge and DIOSynVax report the first human clinical trial of a vaccine whose active component was designed entirely by computer simulations. The candidate pan-Sarbecovirus vaccine, pEVAC-PS, uses a machine-learning-designed "super-antigen"; a phase I trial in 39 healthy volunteers finds it safe and able to trigger immune responses to SARS-CoV-2, SARS-CoV-1, and related bat coronaviruses.
- 9 June – A study in the Journal of Peace Research, using data from the Uppsala Conflict Data Program, reports a record 65 state-based armed conflicts in 2025, including eight interstate conflicts, the highest number since data collection began in 1946. It estimates that 244,600 people were killed in organised violence during the year, driven partly by a sharp rise in one-sided violence against civilians in Sudan.
- 11 June – The National Oceanic and Atmospheric Administration declares the onset of an El Niño event in the tropical Pacific, and forecasts a 63% chance that it will rank among the largest since records began in 1950.
- 18 June – A study published in The Lancet, led by Queen Mary University of London and funded by Cancer Research UK, estimates that the HPV vaccine has prevented around 200 deaths from cervical cancer in England, and finds that no women aged 20–24 died from the disease between 2020 and 2024, the first such period on record.
- 19 June – A study published in Science Advances finds that high-end but physically plausible meltwater from the Greenland ice sheet could significantly worsen the long-term weakening of the Atlantic meridional overturning circulation (AMOC), especially after 2100, but does not make projected AMOC changes abrupt or irreversible on centennial timescales in the model used. In a carbon dioxide reversal experiment beginning in 2250, AMOC strength recovers after carbon dioxide concentrations return to 2015 levels by around the year 2420.
- 25 June – Astronomers report the discovery and confirmation of two unusually low-density exoplanets, TOI-791 b and TOI-791 c, orbiting the star TOI-791 about 1,113 light-years from Earth. Detected using NASA's Transiting Exoplanet Survey Satellite, the Jupiter-sized "super-puff" planets have densities of 0.038 and 0.047 g/cm^{3}, respectively, making them among the lowest-density giant planets known and the largest planets yet found with densities below 0.05 g/cm^{3}.
- 29 June – Palaeontologists identify a fossil vertebra collected on James Ross Island in 1985 as the earliest-known dinosaur bone collected in Antarctica. The specimen, stored for 40 years in the British Antarctic Survey collections, is confirmed to be a tail bone from a titanosaur, a group of long-necked sauropod dinosaurs. The animal is estimated to have lived about 82 million years ago, during the Late Cretaceous, when Antarctica was covered in forest.
- 30 June – Astronomers report a revised orbit and mass for the nearby habitable zone super-Earth GJ 3378 b. Combining radial velocity data from the Habitable-zone Planet Finder, NEID, CARMENES and SPIRou spectrometers, the team finds that the planet has an orbital period of 21.45 days and a minimum mass of 2.3 Earth masses, rather than earlier estimates of 24.73 days and 5.26 Earth masses. The revision leaves the planet within the conservative liquid-water habitable zone of its red dwarf host star, increases the likelihood that it has a terrestrial composition, and suggests that it may have retained an atmosphere despite high X-ray and ultraviolet exposure.

=== July ===
- 1 July
  - Researchers at the University of Minnesota announce the development of SpudCells, artificial cell-like systems assembled from nonliving biochemical components. The structures can replicate their DNA, grow by incorporating material from feeder vesicles, and undergo several rounds of cell division. The achievement represents a significant advance in synthetic biology, although the systems are not considered independently living organisms, as they require externally supplied nutrients and molecular machinery and cannot sustain reproduction indefinitely. The findings are reported in a preprint that has not yet undergone peer review.
  - A study published in Nature reports that GPNMB-targeted CAR-T cells can target both glioblastoma cells and tumour-associated macrophages, eliminating detectable tumours and producing long-term disease control in preclinical models.
  - Astronomers report the discovery of Gaia23bra b, the first gravitationally bound exoplanet detected by the Transiting Exoplanet Survey Satellite using gravitational microlensing. The planet is a super-Jupiter orbiting a K dwarf about 40,000 light-years from Earth.
- 6 July – A study presented at the Federation of European Neuroscience Societies Forum finds that multilingualism is associated with a younger estimated brain age, with people speaking four languages showing brain-connectivity patterns corresponding to about 13 years younger than monolingual people.
- 13 July – Astronomers report the detection of erythrulose, a four-carbon monosaccharide, in the interstellar molecular cloud G+0.693−0.027 near the Galactic Center. The discovery is described as the first detection of a "true sugar" in the interstellar medium, distinguishing it from previously identified sugar-related molecules such as glycolaldehyde.
- 16 July – Astronomers report the first observationally confirmed atmosphere around a rocky exoplanet within its star's habitable zone, after detecting helium escaping from the upper atmosphere of LHS 1140 b, a super-Earth approximately 49 light-years from Earth.
- 29 July – Researchers report a previously unrecognised pathological structure in Alzheimer's disease, termed a "mitochondrial plaque": an accumulation of damaged mitochondria within neuronal processes, associated with impaired mitophagy and lysosomal function. The structures are identified in genetically modified mice and postmortem human brain tissue, sometimes forming independently of amyloid beta plaques, and may represent a potential new therapeutic target.

=== August ===
- 3 August – Researchers propose a theoretical method using quantum lattice gates to perform operations on bosonic quantum error-correcting codes within a single driving cycle, potentially making some operations more than 1,000 times faster than previous approaches and advancing efforts towards fault-tolerant quantum computing.
- 5 August
  - A population-based cohort study published in JAMA Network Open reports that deaths from colorectal cancer among adults aged 50–69 in Spain's Basque Country declined by approximately 50% between 2004 and 2024, following the introduction of a biennial fecal immunochemical test (FIT) screening programme in 2009. The researchers identify an association between the screening programme and declining mortality, although the observational study cannot establish that screening alone caused the reduction.
  - The United States Food and Drug Administration approves Moderna's mFlusiva, the first licensed messenger RNA (mRNA)-based influenza vaccine. The vaccine is approved for adults aged 50 and older, with accelerated approval for those aged 65 and older.
- 13 August – A meta-analysis of more than 480,000 participants finds that regular stair climbing is associated with a 39% lower risk of cardiovascular mortality and a 24% lower risk of death from any cause.
- 17 August
  - Researchers at Pennsylvania State University publicise a prototype memristor combining synthetic DNA with a perovskite semiconductor. The device, described in a study published earlier in 2026, demonstrates resistive switching at operating voltages below 0.1 V, providing a potential approach to energy-efficient non-volatile memory.
  - Researchers at the Max Planck Institute for Marine Microbiology find that dozens of animal species carry enzymes capable of breaking down microbe-derived bioplastics known as PHAs, a long-standing talent once believed to belong exclusively to microorganisms.
- 18 August – Researchers in Austria propose coupling an electron microscope to a trapped-ion quantum computer, allowing quantum information from successive electrons to be combined and potentially enabling high-resolution imaging with fewer electrons, reducing damage to sensitive samples.
- 19 August – Astronomers report the discovery of S301, the closest and fastest star yet observed orbiting Sagittarius A*, the supermassive black hole at the centre of the Milky Way. The star completes an orbit every 8.7 years and reaches about 25,000 km/s, or 8.5% of the speed of light, at its closest approach. Its unusually tight orbit may enable a direct measurement of Sagittarius A*'s spin within about a decade.
- 23 August – A review published in Global Challenges finds that no place on Earth is resilient to all of the major global catastrophic risks considered. Australia shows resilience across the widest range of scenarios, while geographic isolation, food self-sufficiency, high-quality governance and decentralisation emerge as recurring resilience factors.
- 26 August
  - University College London reports that London neurosurgeons have performed the first AI-assisted brain surgery at the National Hospital for Neurology and Neurosurgery in a 48-year-old patient who was diagnosed with a brain tumour in 2024.
  - The U.S. Food and Drug Administration approves the RAS inhibitor drug daraxonrasib as a treatment for metastatic pancreatic cancer.
- 30 August – NASA launches the flagship Nancy Grace Roman Space Telescope aboard a SpaceX Falcon Heavy rocket from the Kennedy Space Center in Florida. Designed to investigate dark energy, dark matter and exoplanets, the observatory has a field of view at least 100 times larger than the Hubble Space Telescope's, with comparable sensitivity and infrared resolution.

=== September ===
- 2 September – A study published in the New England Journal of Medicine reports that the RAS inhibitor drug daraxonrasib, which was approved by the U.S. Food and Drug Administration as a treatment for metastatic pancreatic cancer, also shows promise against lung cancer.
- 3 September
  - OpenAI begins rolling out GPT-6 Astra, a new artificial intelligence model with advances in coding, computer use and scientific research. Initial access is limited to selected organisations.
  - Researchers report that a genetically modified pig kidney functioned in a living human recipient for 271 days, keeping him off dialysis for nine months before its removal. He subsequently received a human donor kidney, marking the first successful use of a pig kidney as a bridge to human kidney transplantation.

17 September: Leopardus tilcayo is described as the first new cat species in over a hundred years.

- 6 September – Researchers at the University of Edinburgh report a theoretical framework using optimal control to enable ultrafast, highly energy-efficient switching of magnetic memory. Computer simulations suggest that optimised magnetic-field pulses could reduce switching energy by orders of magnitude compared with existing memory technologies, bringing it substantially closer to the Landauer limit, the theoretical minimum energy required to process information.
- 8 September – OpenAI announces that an artificial intelligence system has produced a proposed proof addressing the Navier–Stokes existence and smoothness problem, one of the seven Millennium Prize Problems. The proof describes how an initially smooth fluid flow subjected to a smooth external force can develop a singularity in finite time, with fluid velocity becoming unbounded. The Clay Mathematics Institute subsequently states that the problem has apparently been settled, while emphasising that evaluating the work and assigning credit will take time.
- 15 September – A review published in Psychological Medicine finds that reading for pleasure is associated with better brain health, cognition and mental well-being across the lifespan, including improved attention and memory in children and a lower risk of cognitive decline and dementia in older adults. Neuroimaging studies also associate reading with structural and functional differences in brain regions involved in executive control, emotional regulation and social cognition.
- 17 September – A genomic study of South American tiger cats identifies Leopardus tilcayo, a small wild cat from Bolivia's Yungas, as a distinct species. The researchers describe it as the first entirely novel living felid species identified in more than a century.
- 18 September – A study published in Nature Neuroscience, using mouse embryos and human pluripotent stem cells, finds that the forebrain and midbrain develop from a different progenitor cell lineage from the hindbrain, challenging the long-standing model of a single progenitor population for the entire brain. The authors propose that the brain is a composite organ arising from two developmentally distinct systems that may have been evolutionarily conserved for more than 550 million years.

=== October ===
- 3 October – Researchers at the University of Bonn report converting human blood cells into neural stem cells with substantially reduced epigenetic ages. Cells from an 80-year-old donor exhibited a molecular age of less than 20 years, with most age-related epigenetic changes reversing over approximately 50 days. The findings could help scientists investigate the mechanisms of cellular reprogramming and ageing.
- 5 October
  - Karl Deisseroth, Peter Hegemann and Georg Nagel are announced as recipients of the Nobel Prize in Physiology or Medicine for their discoveries concerning light-gated ion channels and optogenetics, a technique that allows researchers to control the activity of specific nerve cells using light.
  - Researchers at the Institute of Photonic Sciences in Spain demonstrate a method of increasing organic solar cell efficiency by using an optical cavity to restrict the angles at which photons are emitted, reducing energy losses. The technique could enable single-junction solar cells to surpass the Shockley–Queisser limit of approximately 33%, potentially reaching efficiencies approaching 43%, although this has not yet been achieved experimentally.
- 6 October – Francis Halzen is awarded the Nobel Prize in Physics for his contributions to the IceCube Neutrino Observatory and the discovery of high-energy neutrinos of astrophysical origin. The observatory uses sensors embedded deep in Antarctic ice to detect neutrinos from distant cosmic sources.
- 7 October
  - Henri B. Kagan and Kensō Soai are announced as recipients of the Nobel Prize in Chemistry for their discoveries concerning nonlinear effects and autocatalysis in asymmetric synthesis. Their research demonstrated how small imbalances between mirror-image molecules can be amplified during chemical reactions, advancing understanding of molecular chirality.
  - A study published in Current Biology reports a 63% decline in occupied chinstrap penguin nests on Zavodovski Island between 2011 and 2025, causing the island to lose its status as home to the world's largest penguin colony. Researchers link the decline to climate-driven changes in the availability of Antarctic krill, while the island's macaroni penguin population has increased.
- 8 October – The World Wide Fund for Nature (WWF) publishes its Living Planet Report 2026, reporting a 73% average decline in the size of monitored vertebrate populations between 1970 and 2022. The Living Planet Index, compiled by the Zoological Society of London, includes 35,803 population trends covering 5,790 species, with the steepest average decline occurring in freshwater ecosystems (85%). The index measures changes in the relative abundance of monitored populations rather than the total number of animals or species lost. Half of the monitored populations are reported as stable or increasing, while the other half are declining.
- 12 October – A study published in Nature Communications finds that Thwaites Glacier in West Antarctica could contribute up to 30 mm to global sea level rise by 2100, approximately twice previous estimates even without additional climate warming. The revised projection accounts for warm seawater penetrating several kilometres beneath the glacier, a process omitted from many earlier ice-sheet models.
- 15 October – Google Quantum AI publishes research demonstrating "magic state cultivation" on its Willow quantum processor, reducing errors by a factor of 40 and achieving 99.99% fidelity in specialised quantum states needed for universal quantum computing. The technique could significantly reduce the hardware requirements for large-scale, fault-tolerant quantum computers.
- 21 October – Physicists at Northwestern University demonstrate the first one-positron quantum cyclotron, trapping a single positron (the antimatter counterpart of the electron) for months and controlling its quantum states. The breakthrough could enable unprecedented measurements of the particle's magnetic moment, providing more stringent tests of CPT symmetry.
- 22 October – A team of Chinese astronomers reports that three previously discovered exoplanets, 24 Boo b, HD 12648 b and TYC 4282-605-1 b, appear to have survived the expansion of their host stars into red giants. Using asteroseismology and stellar evolution models, the researchers find that all three planets occupy orbits within the regions their stars are predicted to have engulfed, challenging existing theories of planetary survival and stellar evolution.
- 27 October – Astronomers announce the discovery of 2026 ED138, a large trans-Neptunian object identified in data from the Vera C. Rubin Observatory. Located approximately 46 astronomical units from the Sun and estimated to be 600–1,500 km in diameter, it is among the largest known dwarf planet candidates. Further observations are needed to determine its precise size.

=== November ===
- 2 November
  - Researchers led by Curtin University report possible fossilised red blood cells and chemical signatures of heme in 115-million-year-old bones of Aratasaurus museunacionali, a theropod dinosaur from Brazil. The findings, published in Proceedings of the National Academy of Sciences, may represent the oldest chemical evidence of dinosaur blood, although some palaeontologists dispute whether the microscopic structures are genuinely red blood cells.
  - Researchers at Shanghai Jiao Tong University develop an experimental blood-filtering device, known as the "Black-hole system", that uses microfluidics to remove circulating tumour cells from the bloodstream. In mice with breast cancer, the device, used alongside chemotherapy, reduces tumour recurrence and improves survival, suggesting a potential new approach to preventing metastasis following surgery.
- 3 November – Scientists at CERN's LHCb experiment, led by the University of Cambridge, report the first single-experiment evidence of an extremely rare decay of a B meson into a muon and an antimuon, with a statistical significance of 3.2 sigma. The finding could help researchers probe previously unexplored physics at zeptometre scales, potentially revealing new particles beyond the Standard Model.
- 9 November – Researchers at the University of Cambridge demonstrate that an experimental messenger RNA therapy can stimulate the division of adult heart muscle cells and improve cardiac function following heart attacks in mice. The treatment temporarily induces the production of two proteins, Myc and cyclin T1, increasing the volume of blood pumped per heartbeat by approximately 10% compared with controls, with improvements persisting for 12 weeks.
- 18 November – NASA's Voyager 1 becomes the first human-made object to reach a distance of one light-day (25.9 billion kilometres) from Earth, nearly 50 years after its launch in 1977. At this distance, radio signals take 24 hours to travel between Earth and the spacecraft.
- 20 November
  - Researchers present promising results from a phase I/II clinical trial of daraxonrasib, a targeted cancer drug, combined with chemotherapy for advanced pancreatic cancer. Among 61 patients, tumours shrink or become undetectable in 60.7% of cases, including 8.2% with no detectable tumours on scans. Larger trials are needed to establish whether the treatment improves survival.
  - Mathematician Levent Alpöge announces an AI-assisted proof of the Riemann hypothesis, a 167-year-old problem concerning the distribution of prime numbers and one of the Millennium Prize Problems. Developed with Anthropic's Claude AI system, the proof comprises approximately 17 million lines of Lean code and also covers the generalized Riemann hypothesis. The Lean and Mathlib communities confirm the formal proof's correctness the following day, although wider mathematical review remains ongoing.

== See also ==
- 2026 in spaceflight
- 2026 in Antarctica
- 2026 in climate change
