= Living Planet =

Living Planet may refer to:

- The Living Planet, 1984 BBC nature documentary series
  - The Living Planet: Music from the BBC TV Series
- Living Planet Index, an indicator of biological diversity by the World Wide Fund for Nature and the Zoological Society of London
  - Living Planet Report, a report published by the World Wide Fund for Nature
- Living Planet Programme, a programme within the European Space Agency, renamed to FutureEO
