= Decline in wild mammal populations =

Ecological trend

Biomass of mammals on Earth as of 2018
1. Livestock, mostly cattle and pigs (60.0%)
2. Humans (36.0%)
3. Wild mammals (4.00%)

The decline of wild mammal populations globally has been an occurrence spanning over the past 50,000 years, at the same time as the populations of humans and livestock have increased. Nowadays, the total biomass of wild mammals on land is believed to be seven times lower than its prehistoric values, while the biomass of marine mammals had declined fivefold. At the same time, the biomass of humans is "an order of magnitude higher than that of all wild mammals", and the biomass of livestock mammals like pigs and cattle is even larger than that. Even as wild mammals had declined, the growth in the numbers of humans and livestock had increased total mammal biomass fourfold. Only 4% of that increased number are wild mammals, while livestock and humans amount to 60% and 36%. Alongside the simultaneous halving of plant biomass, these striking declines are considered part of the prehistoric phase of the Holocene extinction.

Since the second half of the 20th century, a range of protected areas and other wildlife conservation efforts (such as the Repopulation of wolves in Midwestern United States) have been implemented. These have had some impact on preserving wild mammal numbers. There is still some debate over the total extent of recent declines in wild mammals and other vertebrate species. In any case, many species are now in a worse state than decades ago. Hundreds of species are critically endangered. Climate change also has negative impacts on land mammal populations.

== Declines in geologic and prehistoric timeframes ==
Historically, the Quaternary extinction event was the most dramatic episode of wild mammal decline, as it saw the disappearance of appromixately half of all terrestrial mammal species with a body mass greater than 40 kg. Statistically, this meant a 14% reduction in the average body size of wildlife over the past 125,000 years. While some researchers attribute that eradication of all non-African megafauna to prehistoric climate change, most now believe it was wholly or predominantly driven by human activity. Many wild mammal species continued to decline at a slower rate afterwards. Prominent examples on land include the collapse of historic American bison herds on the Great Plains, or the extinction of a wide range of small marsupials in Australia. On sea, whaling drove similarly severe declines in the numbers of marine mammals. The total numbers of wild mammals are unlikely to recover to anywhere near their prehistoric peaks, as the historic replacement of forests and wetlands with cropland and pasture means that the Earth's carrying capacity for wild terrestrial species will remain lowered unless it is reversed.

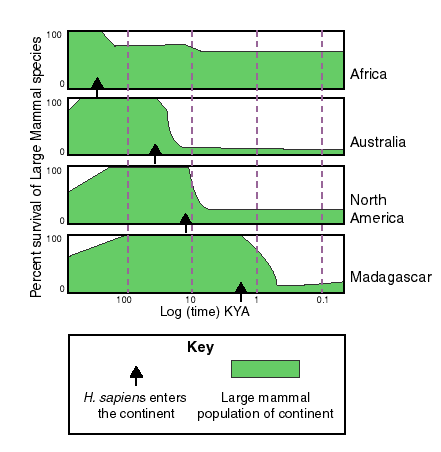
The percentage of [megafauna on different land masses over time, with the arrival of humans indicated.

== Causes of human-related decline ==

- Extinct in the wild (EW): 1 species
- Critically endangered (CR): 236 species
- Endangered (EN): 565 species
- Vulnerable (VU): 571 species
- Near threatened (NT): 405 species
- Least concern (LC): 3,407 species
- Data deficient (DD): 789 species
Mammalian species (IUCN, 2026.1)
- 6,054 extant species have been evaluated
- 5,328 of those are fully assessed (Note: excludes data deficient evaluations.)
- 4,682 are not threatened at present (Note: NT and LC.)
- 1,372 to 2,179 are threatened (Note: Threatened comprises CR, EN and VU. Upper estimate additionally includes DD.)
- 97 to 126 are extinct or extinct in the wild:
  - 96 extinct (EX) species (Note: Chart omits extinct (EX) species)
  - 1 extinct in the wild (EW)
  - 29 possibly extinct [CR(PE)]
  - 0 possibly extinct in the wild [CR(PEW)]

As the human population grew and colonization pushed deeper around the globe, and as the environmental footprint of the average human has grown, so has the pressure on ecosystems, and their inhabitants, including wild mammals. Over the past several centuries, wild mammal extinctions tended to be concentrated among the small island species, whose endemic populations are constrained in size and range by their limited habitat, and in Australia, where similar dynamics have played out. Since the European settlement 10% of Australia's 273 terrestrial mammals went extinct, (a loss of one to two species per decade). Currently, 21% of Australia's mammals are threatened, and unlike in most other continents, the main cause is predation by feral species, such as cats.

In general, habitat degradation, through activities such as deforestation for land development, is currently the main anthropogenic cause of species extinctions. The main cause of habitat degradation worldwide is agriculture, with urban sprawl, logging, mining and some fishing practices close behind. Disease can also be a factor: white nose syndrome in bats, for example, is causing a substantial decline in their populations and may even lead to the extinction of a species. Another example is the Devil facial tumour disease, which has devastated populations of Tasmanian devils. For wild mammals, overhunting can have a proportionally greater impact than on the other wild animals. Terrestrial mammals, such as the tiger and deer, are mainly hunted for their pelts and in some cases meat, and marine mammals can be hunted for their oil and leather. Specific targeting of one species can resonate through the wider ecosystem due to coextinction processes, especially if the targeted species is a keystone species. Sea otters, for example, were hunted in the maritime fur trade, and their drop in population led to the rise in sea urchins—their main food source—which decreased the population of kelp—the sea urchin's and Steller's sea cow's main food source—leading to the extinction of the Steller's sea cow. The hunting of an already limited species can easily lead to its extinction, as with the bluebuck whose range was confined to 1,700 square miles (4,400 km^{2}) and which was hunted into extinction soon after discovery by European settlers.

Such pressures on wild species can be alleviated through wildlife conservation efforts, such as the establishment of protected areas. From 1996 to 2008, conservation efforts in 109 countries reduced the extinction risk of their wild mammals and birds by 29%, while conservation action throughout 2010s lowered the average extinction risk of birds, mammals and amphibians by at least 20%. Some mammal-specific successes include the conservation of ungulates, 6% of which would have likely been extinct or extinct in the wild without them. Another example is the rebound of wolf populations across much of Europe and North America, including through measures such as Repopulation of wolves in Midwestern United States. On sea, the decline of whaling had seen rebounds of a range of species, such as blue whales and humpback whales. However, about a third of marine mammals are still considered to be at risk of extinction.

There is some debate over the severity of declining trends in the global mammal and the broader vertebrate population: while the Living Planet Report of the World Wide Fund for Nature reported a 68% decline in the aggregate wild vertebrate populations since 1970, a scientific reanalysis of its data in Nature found that 98.6% of vertebrate populations show no global trend over that period, with vertebrate declines disproportionately driven by 1% of the species, mostly clustered in the Indo-Pacific region and among several reptile and amphibian groups. Even so, that "extremely declining" cluster also includes many "larger animals", which are often mammals. A separate analysis of 177 mammal species with the most-detailed data found that all of them have lost over 30% of their geographic range, and over 40% retain less than a fifth of their past range, which is impossible without a severe decline in population. Examples of notable mammals with declining populations include pangolins, cheetahs (around 7,000 individuals) and Sumatran and Borneo orangutans (no more than 5,000 combined), or even the 43% drop for the African lion population since 1993 due to declines in West Africa. Globally, 27% of mammal species are threatened with extinction, while 233 species are critically endangered. 74 mammal species are believed to be "on the brink", meaning that they retain fewer than 1000 members, with many of those possessing fewer than 250 members.

=== Climate change ===
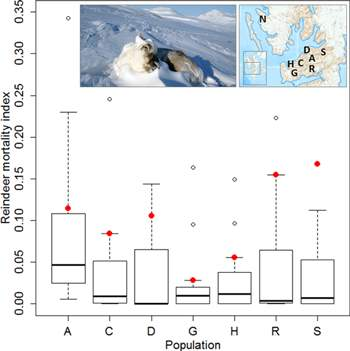
In 2012, there was a large spike in reindeer mortality in Svalbard, after sudden winter warming caused an extreme rain-on-snow event.

Current climate change influences species survival in a given area. Some of the first studies of the influence of climatic variables on wild mammals took place in the United States in 1960s. They analysed the impacts of severe winter weather events on the survival and reproduction of species such as Missouri cottontails and northern Montana Pronghorns., sometimes using radio transmitters. As the warming progressed, such severe winter weather decreased, and instead, warming of previously very cold places, such as the High Arctic can wreak havoc with the ecosystems. For instance, warming-driven increase in precipitation causes warm rain to fall onto the permafrost, which becomes unstable and can collapse from the mountainsides in avalanches. On multiple instances, this has blocked the winter food supply of reindeer populations, and led to their mass starvation in places like the Svalbard of Norway and the Yamal Peninsula of Russia: in the latter area, 61,000 reindeer died over the 2013–2014 winter as the result.

In 2019, historical records from the past 300 years were used to quantify both anthropogenic and climate stressors and their role in te local extinction of 11 medium- and large-sized animals in China. Both climate warming and cooling can cause range shifts and local extinction of animals, but quantitative evidence is rare due to the lack of long-term spatial-temporal data. In Extreme temperature change was negatively associated with increased local extinction of mammals such as the gibbon, macaque, tiger, and water deer. Researchers concluded that while premodern cooling trend may have contributed to extinctions of tiger subspecies in the west and north of China, the recent global warming might contribute to the complete extinction of tigers in southern China.

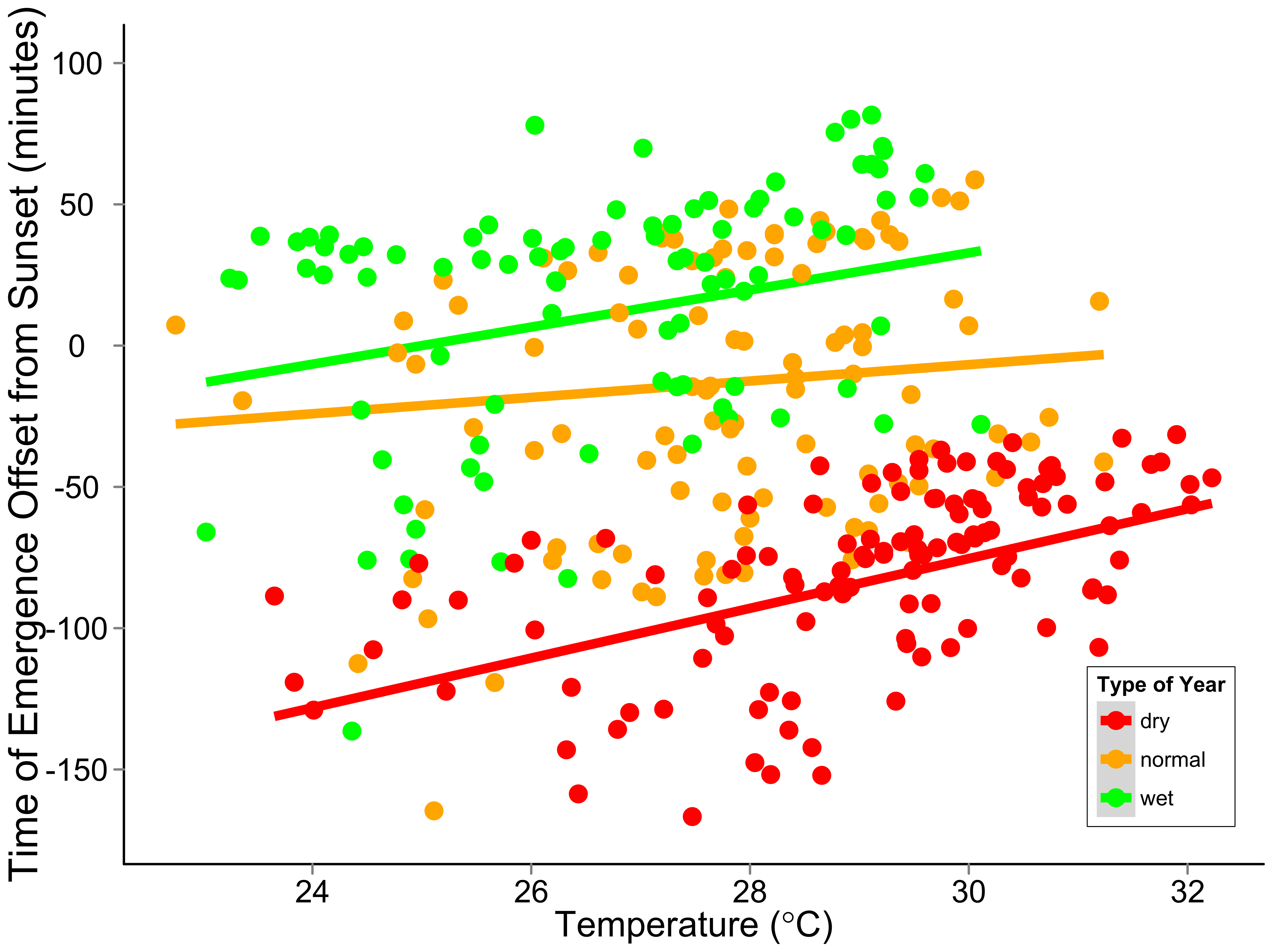
The impact of temperature on Brazilian free-tailed bat phenology in Brazil.

In all, climate change is already believed to have had negative impacts on 47% of flightless land mammals. While "flightless" excludes bats, there's also substantial evidence of them being negatively affected. For instance, Brazilian free-tailed bats are forced to emerge to feed earlier in the evening as their region becomes drier, even if it exposes them to more predators or competitor insectivores. In other places, bats have been exposed to increased mortality due to heat stress. In Australia, flying foxes live comfortably below 42 °C (108 °F), but climate change caused a heatwave in 2014, which led to thousands of flying fox deaths. Mass mortality was highly visible, to the point fire trucks were deployed to spray the bats in an attempt to cool them down. A third of the entire species is believed to have been lost in that event. 2019–2020 Australia bushfire season had killed over 1 billion animals and displaced around 2 billion more, including large numbers of threatened or endangered mammal species such as koalas. And in the wake of 2019 Amazon rainforest wildfires, the World Wildlife Fund concluded that the jaguar is already "near threatened" and the loss of food supplies and habitat due to the fires make the situation more critical. The fires affect water chemistry (such as decreasing the amount of dissolved oxygen in the water), temperature, and erosion rates, which in turn affects fish and mammals that depend on fish, such as the giant otter (Pteronura brasiliensis).

Relative to the rate of climate change, evolutionary change is usually considered to be too slow to allow for genetic adaptation among species. However, microevolution is a genetic adaptation that deals with heritable shifts in allele frequencies in a population and is not characterized by the slow process of speciation, or the formation of a new distinct species. However, larger terrestrial animals (including many mammals) usually cannot adapt with microevolution, as the rate of climate change is still too fast for this evolutionary process. Some, like the kangaroo, can still benefit from a very broad climatic tolerance. Others would have to rely on phenotypic plasticity. A plastic response to climate change includes expressing a different phenotype that may lead to differing morphology, phenology, or rate of activity . Unlike genetic adaptation, phenotypic plasticity allows the animal itself to respond to climate change without a change in its genetic makeup. This mechanism that allows this process involves changes in DNA packaging in the nucleus that alters the chance of a particular gene being expressed. Phenological changes are observed and taken as evidence that species are adjusting to environmental changes.

Although species may adapt to changing climates, either through genetic or phenotypic adaptation, all species have limits to their capacity for adaptive response to changing temperatures. However, only around 4% of all mammals that are deemed climate sensitive by the IUC have been studied in regards to linking their demographic composition (i.e. survival, development, and reproduction) to climate change. There is a large discrepancy between the locations of demographic studies and the species that are currently assessed as most vulnerable to climate change. It is also incredibly difficult for studies to focus specifically and determine a straightforward relationship between limited tolerance to high temperatures and local extinction, as a diverse set of factors, such as food abundance, human activity, and mismatched timing, can all play a role in a species' local or mass extinction. To assess population viability under climate change, more coordinated actions need to be prioritized and taken to collect data on how different species' demographic rates can persist and respond to climate change.

==== Specific predictions of population decline or extinction ====
A 2023 paper concluded that under the high-warming SSP5–8.5 scenario, 50.3% of mammals would lose at least some habitat by 2100 as the conditions become more arid. Out of those, 9.5% would lose over half of their habitat due to an increase in dryness alone, while 3.2% could be expected to lose their entire habitat ad the result. These figures go down to 38.27%, 4.96% and 2.22% under the "intermediate" SSP2-4.5 scenario, and to 22.65%, 2.03% and 1.15% under the high-mitigation SSP1-2.6.
