= WASP-189 b =

Ultra-hot Jupiter in the constellation Libra

Discovery
- Discovery date: 2018
- Detection method: Transit

Orbital characteristics
- Semi-major axis: 0.05053
- Orbital period (sidereal): 2.72 d
- Star: WASP-189 (HD 133112)

Physical characteristics
- Mean radius: 1.600+0.017 −0.016 R_{J}
- Mass: 1.99 M_{J}
- Albedo: <0.48
- Temperature: 3470 K

WASP-189 b (also known as HD 133112 b) is an ultra-hot jupiter that orbits around the A-type star WASP-189 which is located about 322 light years from Earth in the constellation Libra. It was first discovered in 2018, and was observed in 2020 by CHEOPS (Characterising Exoplanets Satellite).

It has a mass of 1.99 Jupiters and a radius of 1.6 Jupiters. It orbits around a rapidly rotating A6IV-V star. It has a polar orbit around the star with a distance of 0.05 AU taking around 2.72 days to complete and orbit.

== Discovery ==
WASP-189 b was first discovered in 2018 using the transit method. In 2020, astronomers used CHEOPS to observe it.

== Characteristics ==
The planet has a mass of around 1.99 M_{J} with a radius of around 1.6 R_{J}.

=== Temperature ===
The CHEOPS spacecraft was used to estimate the temperature of WASP-189 b. Assuming inefficient heat redistribution, the temperature of WASP-189 b was estimated to be around 3,200 °C (5,790 °F; 3,470 K). Assuming efficient heat redistribution and zero albedo, the temperature was calculated to be around 2,367 °F (2,367 °F; 1,570 K). These observations would make WASP-189 b a ultra-hot jupiter and one of the hottest known exoplanets discovered to date.

=== Atmosphere ===
Various spacecraft have been used to study the atmosphere of WASP-189 b such as CHEOPS and CUTE (Colorado Ultraviolet Transit Experiment). The extreme temperatures of ultra-hot Jupiters such as WASP-189 b allow for the study of refractory elements that remain gaseous at high temperatures.

Results show that the atmosphere contains many metal and volatile elements. CHEOPS observed titanium oxide (TiO) and vanadium oxide (VO) and a variety of metals such as chromium (Cr), magnesium (Mg), vanadium (V) and manganese (Mn). Singly ionized Iron (Fe+, Fe II) and Titanium (Ti, Ti+) were also found. The Immersion Grating Infrared Spectrometer (IGRINS) on Gemini South detected neutral Iron (Fe I), magnesium (Mg I), silicon (Si I), water (H2O), carbon monoxide (CO) and hydroxyl (OH).

== Magnetosphere ==
In 2026, astronomers detected strong evidence for the magnetic field for seven ultra-hot Jupiters, including WASP-189 b, which based on the measurement of their global wind speeds between dayside and nightside. Their magnetosphere $B$ values are comparable to that of Jupiter and Saturn.

== See also ==
- Hot Jupiter
- Characterising Exoplanets Satellite (CHEOPS)
- Wide Angle Search for Planets (WASP)
