= LHS 1903 =

Red dwarf star in the constellation Lynx

- Artist's impression of LHS 1903 system Credit: ESA

Observation data Epoch J2000 Equinox ICRS
- Constellation: Lynx
- Right ascension: 07^{h} 11^{m} 27.9427^{s}
- Declination: +48° 19′ 49.3991″
- Apparent magnitude (V): 12.21

Characteristics
- Evolutionary stage: main sequence
- Spectral type: M0.5V or dM1.5
- Apparent magnitude (G): 11.39

Astrometry
| Radial velocity (R_{v}) | 30.83±0.41 km/s |
| Proper motion (μ) | RA: −92.924±0.018 mas/yr Dec.: −570.393±0.015 mas/yr |
| Parallax (π) | 28.0525±0.0242 mas |
| Distance | 116.3 ± 0.1 ly (35.65 ± 0.03 pc) |
| Absolute magnitude (M_{V}) | +8.89 |

Details
| Mass | 0.538+0.039 −0.030 M_{☉} |
| Radius | 0.539±0.014 R_{☉} |
| Luminosity | 0.05 L_{☉} |
| Surface gravity (log g) | 4.75±0.12 cgs |
| Temperature | 3664±70 K |
| Metallicity [Fe/H] | −0.11±0.09 dex |
| Rotation | ~40.8 d |
| Age | 7.08+2.87 −1.98 Gyr |

Other designations
- HIP 34730, G 107-55, LSPM J0711+4819, NLTT 17491, TOI-1730, TIC 318022259, TYC 3396-1862-1, 2MASS J07112794+4819501, Gaia DR2 978086481343568128, Gaia DR3 978086481343568128

Database references
| SIMBAD | data |
| Exoplanet Archive | data |

LHS 1903 is a red dwarf star located about 116 light years from Earth in the constellation Lynx, near to 21 Lyncis. It is thought to be a member of the Milky Way's thick disk.

It hosts four known exoplanets. Its planetary system has been described as "inside-out", as instead of the usual pattern where gas planets tend to form further out, its planets are arranged in a configuration where the innermost and outermost planets are rocky, while the middle planets are gas dwarfs.

The code LHS 1903 comes from the Luyten Half-Second catalogue – a list of stars with an annual proper motion of more than half a second, which was compiled by Willem Jacob Luyten in 1979. The four planets are lettered b, c, d and e, following exoplanet naming convention.

== Planetary system ==
The planetary system of LHS 1903 is notable for its unusual architecture. The system has an apparent reversed arrangement: the denser, rocky planet e is located further away from the star, outside the orbits of the planets c and d, which are less dense and volatile-rich. This configuration is the opposite of what is typically observed in multiplanetary systems, where gas- or ice-rich planets tend to form further from the star and migrate inward over time. An additional peculiarity of this system is that the planet e being a terrestrial super-Earth goes against the previous observations that stars from the thick disk typically only host mini-Neptunes of this size.

The three inner planets of the system were first observed by TESS between 2019 and 2023, which prompted follow-up photometric observations that discovered a fourth planet in CHEOPS data. Additionally, high-resolution spectroscopic observations of the star allowed for determination of the planets' masses according to the radial velocity method.

A lack of noise in astrometry recorded by Gaia also rules out the presence of additional gas giants or brown dwarfs in the system.

The LHS 1903 planetary system
| Companion (in order from star) | Mass | Semimajor axis (AU) | Orbital period (days) | Eccentricity | Inclination (°) | Radius |
|---|---|---|---|---|---|---|
| b | 3.28±0.42 M_{🜨} | 0.02656+0.00055 −0.00058 | 2.1555098+0.0000026 −0.0000029 | 0.015+0.014 −0.010 | — | 1.382±0.046 R_{🜨} |
| c | 4.55+0.73 −0.69 M_{🜨} | 0.05387+0.00112 −0.00117 | 6.226185+0.000028 −0.000026 | 0.089+0.036 −0.030 | — | 2.046+0.078 −0.074 R_{🜨} |
| d | 5.96+1.15 −1.13 M_{🜨} | 0.08604+0.00178 −0.00186 | 12.566287+0.000032 −0.000028 | 0.112+0.055 −0.044 | — | 2.500+0.078 −0.077 R_{🜨} |
| e | 5.79+1.60 −1.61 M_{🜨} | 0.15135+0.00314 −0.00338 | 29.31773+0.00028 −0.00025 | 0.014+0.015 −0.010 | — | 1.732+0.059 −0.058 R_{🜨} |

The radial velocity data hints at a possible additional planet with a period of ~53.9 days.

Orbital periods of the planets in the system are close to integer ratios at 2:1 for the pair c:d and 7:3 for the pair d:e. A numerical orbital evolution analysis indicates that the planets c and d are not in a mean motion resonance, but the planets d and e likely are. This is also supported by the search for transit-timing variations, which revealed no variation for the planets b and c, but a possible weak variation in the planet d and e timings originating from the higher order 7:3 resonance.

The determination of the planets' radii and masses allows for the calculation of the average density of each planet, which is an indicator of their composition. The innermost planet has a density slightly higher than Earth: 1.24+0.21
−0.19 ρ_{🜨} (6.82+1.15
−1.04 g/cm^{3}), consistent with being rocky. The planets c and d have lower densities at 0.53+0.11
−0.09 ρ_{🜨} (2.91+0.60
−0.52 g/cm^{3}) and 0.38+0.09
−0.08 ρ_{🜨} (2.09+0.47
−0.43 g/cm^{3}), respectively; this is consistent with a primarily rocky composition but with a lower-density envelope of water or hydrogen and helium. The outermost planet also has an Earth-like density of 1.11+0.33
−0.31 ρ_{🜨} (6.10+1.83
−1.71 g/cm^{3}), meaning it is also a rocky planet without an extended atmosphere.

=== Formation ===
The discovery team suggested that the LHS 1903 system may have experienced a unique formation history, possibly involving late-stage accretion of the outer planet after the protoplanetary disk had already been depleted of gas. Alternative explanations, such as a dynamic process of planetary migration that rearranged the planets after their initial formation, or a giant impact which blew away its original atmosphere, have been ruled out through simulations of orbital evolution.

The system is an important test case for the theoretical models of planet formation. A gap feature in observed radii between the super-Earths and mini-Neptunes, called the radius valley, can be explained by different processes. The thermally driven mass loss hypothesis predicts that the planets initially form with a gas envelope. Subsequent heating, either due to stellar irradiation via photoevaporation, or due to internal heating (which can be tidal or radiogenic), causes atmospheric escape. In this model, the planets accrete both the solid and volatile materials from the protoplanetary disk at once in a similar ratio, but planets which are smaller or on closer orbits lose their primordial atmospheres later on. On contrary, the gas-depleted formation hypothesis explains terrestrial planets as having formed too slowly, only building mass after the volatile materials within the protoplanetary disk has already been dispersed. This process has been called "inside-out planet formation". The two processes are expected to compete with each other, and may explain the formation history of different systems around different stars. The two models predict a similar location of the radius valley, making validation of either model over the other hard. The planet LHS 1903 e has provided the first strong case for a planet which clearly favours the formation according to the gas-depleted formation model. This is also similar to the models previously invoked to explain the formation of the Earth and the rest of the inner planets.

== See also ==
- 2026 in science
- List of exoplanets discovered in 2026
- List of multiplanetary systems
