= Maria Dornelas =

Fellow of the Royal Society of Edinburgh, researcher in biodiversity

Maria Dornelas FRSE
- Education: BSc University of Lisbon, PhD James Cook University, post doctoral fellowship University of St. Andrews
- Occupations: Researcher and professor
- Employer: University of St. Andrews School of Biology
- Known for: Research into biodiversity changes on coral reefs and global ecosystems; macroecology

Maria Dornelas FRSE is a researcher in biodiversity and professor of biology at St. Andrew's University. She was made a Fellow of the Royal Society of Edinburgh in 2021. Her research into biodiversity change has challenged previous views, on the growth and decline of coral reefs to understanding global biodiversity with data analysis on how species or ecosystems are changing in the Anthropocene.

== Education and career ==
Dornelas completed her BSc at the University of Lisbon, graduating in 2000, and then a doctorate in the School of Marine Biology, studying 'biodiversity patterns in the context of neutral theory at James Cook University in Queensland, Australia in 2006. Her research challenged the orthodoxy of how coral reefs developed and died off. It was published in Nature and called ' a paper that will turn our attention in a completely new direction' by Dr John Pandolfi of the University of Queensland.

After her postdoctoral fellowship, in 2012 she became a Lecturer, then Reader, now Professor, in the Centre for Biological Diversity of the School of Biology at University of St Andrews. She was external examiner for University College London on 'Predicting population trends under environmental change: comparing methods against observed data'. She is a visiting professor in the School of Geosciences at the University of Edinburgh.

Her interest in the ecology of the tropical areas, and coral in particular grew during her undergraduate honours project in Mozambique. Her fellowship included working with the University of Aveiro and the ARC Centre of Excellence Coral Reef Studies on 'morphological and life history diversity of corals' (2008-9). When not focused on biodiversity change, macroecology or reef ecology, her research also looked into Trinidadian guppies, in considering polyandry in fish.

== Selected publications ==
Dornelas's key published works are listed by the University of St Andrews. She compiled and standardised a database of publicly available timeseries, which is the basis of the BioTIME project.

Her funded project from the Leverhulme Trust (2019-2029) is generating datasets, and cross-discipline collaborations.

Citations can be found in Google Scholar.

== Biodiversity debates ==
Dornelas has engaged in a number of public outreach events such as talking to the British Ecological Society on 'Is biodiversity declining?' She was a member of the Young Academy of Scotland, and was positively debating the future of higher education and its resilience in 2020 during the COVID-19 pandemic.

In 2020 Dornelas contributed to the World Economic Forum discussion on How forest loss has changed biodiversity across the globe over the last 150 years. And her collaborative work, published in Nature in 2020 has contributed to debate on vertebrate species decline, for example in a Living Planet Report, showing that average declines in populations do not reflect some rapidly declining species at risk.

She has been made a Fellow of the Royal Society of Edinburgh in 2021.
