= HD 137010 b =

Candidate exoplanet

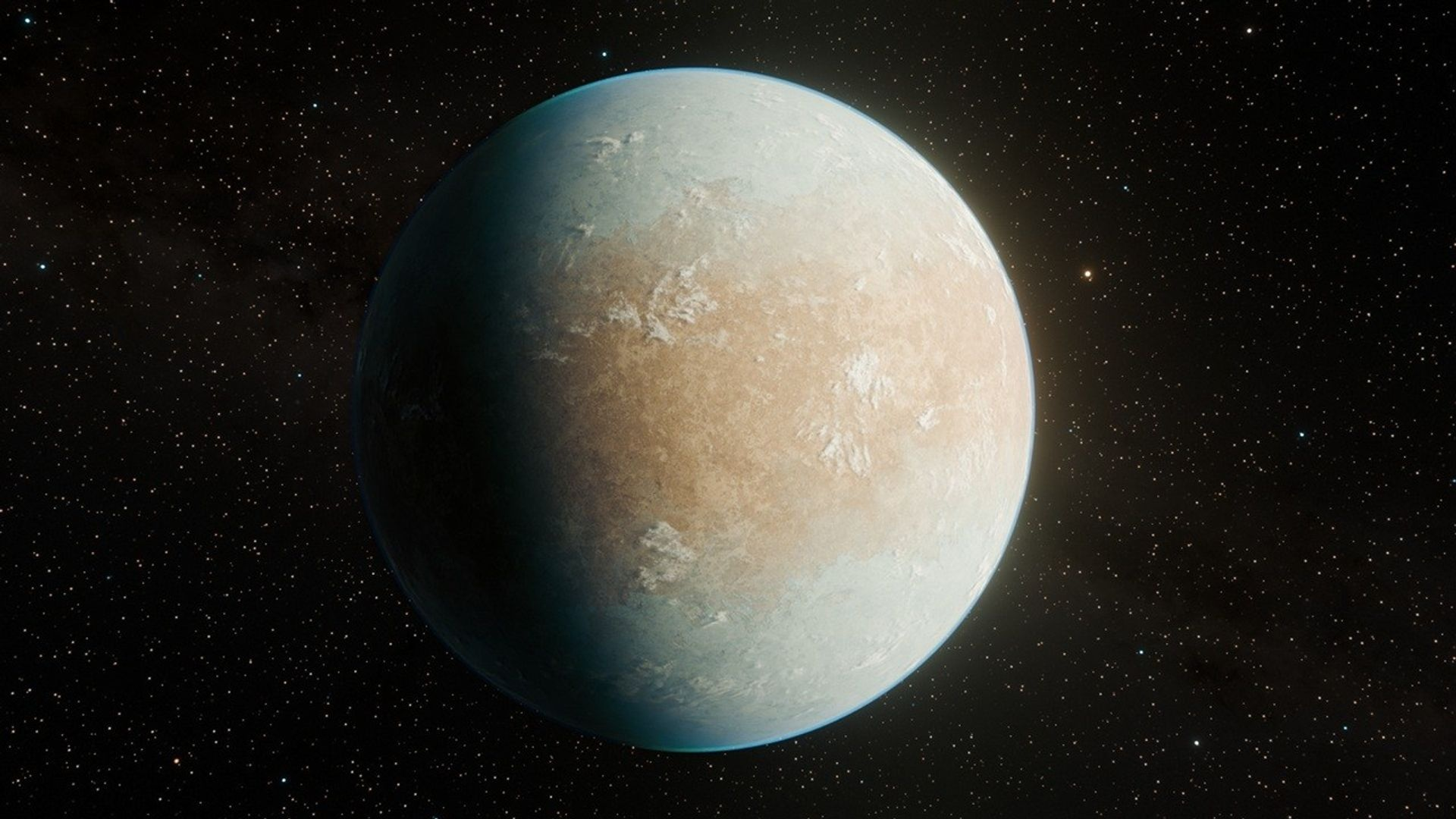
- Artistic representation of exoplanet candidate HD 137010 b

Discovery
- Discovered by: Kepler (K2)
- Discovery date: January 27, 2026
- Detection method: Transit

Orbital characteristics
- Semi-major axis: 0.88+0.3 −0.1 AU
- Eccentricity: 0
- Orbital period (sidereal): 355.0+200.0 −59.0 d
- Inclination: >89.82+0.05 −0.03
- Star: HD 137010

Physical characteristics
- Mean radius: 1.06+0.06 −0.05 R_{🜨}
- Temperature: 205.0 ± 25.0 K (−68.1 ± 25.0 °C; −90.7 ± 45.0 °F)

HD 137010 b is an exoplanet candidate detected by the Kepler's K2 mission of NASA. Orbiting the K-type dwarf star HD 137010 in the constellation of Libra, it is located approximately 146 light-years from the Solar System. The candidate was identified from a single 10-hour transit event observed during K2 Campaign 15 in 2017, suggesting an orbital period of about 355 days, nearly identical to that of Earth. With a radius of 1.06 times that of Earth, it is classified as a potential Super-Earth or Earth analog, likely rocky in composition. Due to its host star's lower luminosity, HD 137010 b receives only about 29% of the incident flux that Earth does, placing it near the outer edge of the system's habitable zone with an estimated equilibrium temperature around −68 °C (−90 °F), potentially colder than Mars. Confirmation as a genuine exoplanet requires additional transits or alternative observations, which may be pursued with missions like TESS or CHEOPS.

Artist's concept animation of the exoplanet candidate HD 137010 b

== Discovery and observation ==
HD 137010 b was first flagged as a potential planet candidate by citizen scientists participating in the Planet Hunters project, which sifts through data from NASA's Kepler Space Telescope. The signal was overlooked by automated detection algorithms, which prioritize multiple transits, until astrophysicist Alexander Venner re-examined the K2 Campaign 15 data during his Ph.D. research at the University of Southern Queensland. The single transit, lasting approximately 10 hours, was recorded in 2017 and indicated a small planetary body eclipsing its host star. The discovery team, including collaborators from the Max Planck Institute for Astronomy, ruled out false positives such as stellar binaries through detailed modeling.

The findings were published on January 27, 2026, in The Astrophysical Journal Letters under the title "A Cool Earth-sized Planet Candidate Transiting a Tenth Magnitude K-dwarf From K2". Venner presented the results at the Rocky Worlds conference. Follow-up observations are challenging due to the long orbital period, which reduces the likelihood of repeated transits within a single mission's timeframe; proposed strategies include radial velocity measurements or targeted monitoring with the James Webb Space Telescope (JWST).

== Host star ==
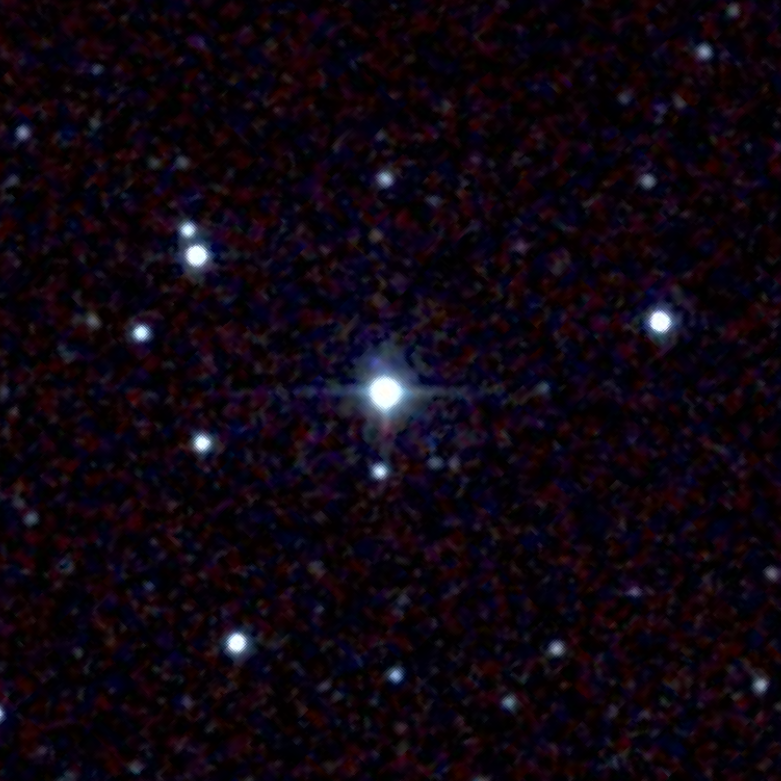
2MASS image of HD 137010

HD 137010 is a K-type dwarf with a visual magnitude of 10.1, making it observable with amateur telescopes. The star has an effective temperature approximately 1,000 K cooler than the Sun's 5,772 K, resulting in about 70% of the Sun's mass and radius, and correspondingly lower luminosity. This dimmer output shifts the habitable zone inward compared to solar-type systems, influencing the thermal environment of orbiting planets like HD 137010 b.

== Characteristics ==
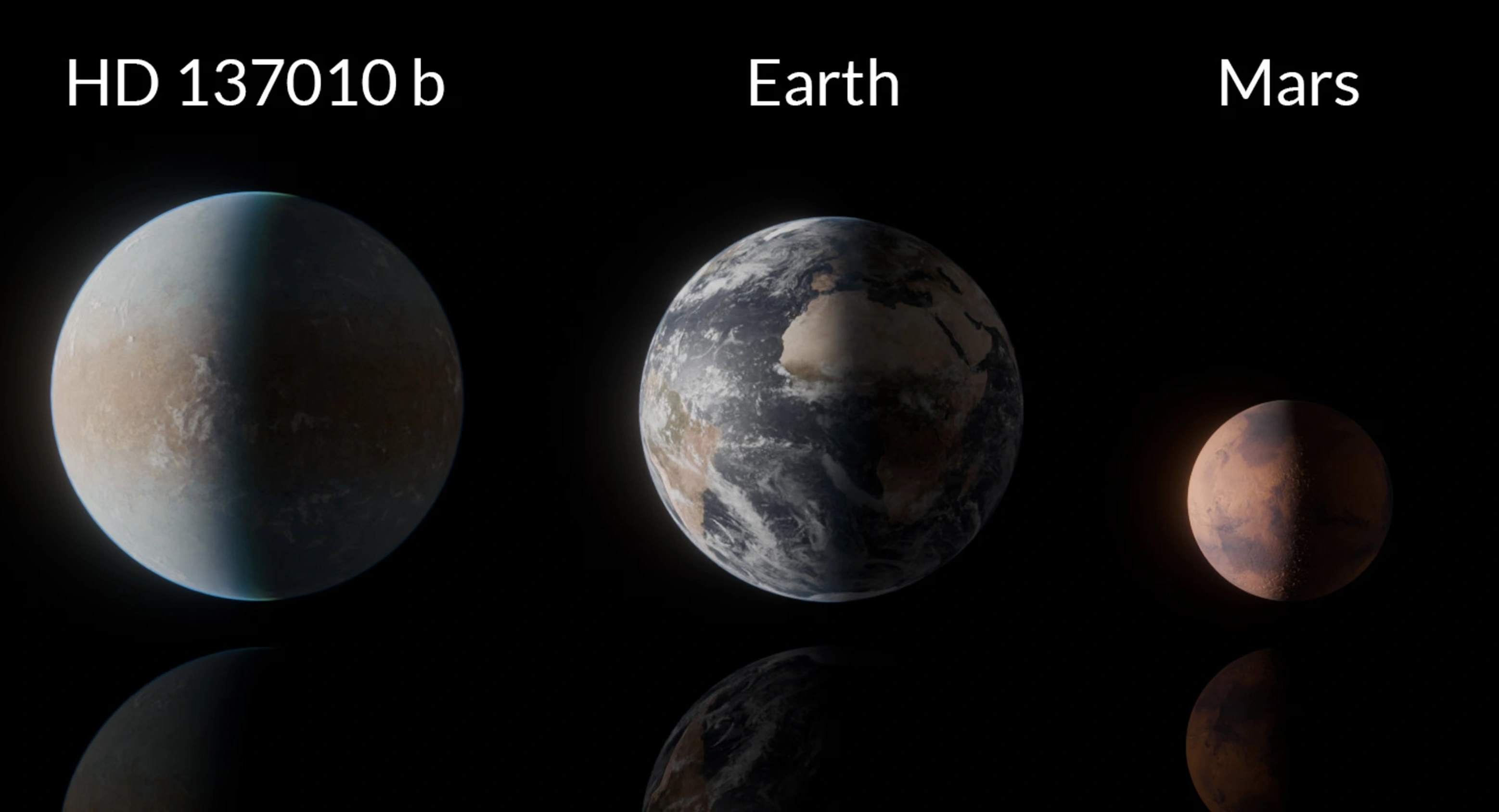
Size comparison of HD 137010 b with Earth and Mars

HD 137010 b has an estimated radius of 1.06+0.06
−0.05 R_{🜨}, placing it in the range of small, probably terrestrial worlds. Its orbital period is 355.0+200.0
−59.0 d, with a semi-major axis of 0.88+0.3
−0.1 AU, yielding an nearly circular orbit (eccentricity ≈ 0) and near-edge-on inclination for transit visibility. The planet receives an incident bolometric flux of 0.29+0.11
−0.13 times that incident on Earth (F⊕), leading to a blackbody equilibrium temperature of roughly −68 °C, though actual surface conditions would depend on atmospheric properties. No mass or density measurements are available, but its size suggests a rocky composition similar to Earth.

=== Habitability ===
Positioned at the outer boundary of its star's habitable zone as defined by Kopparapu et al. (2013), HD 137010 b may support liquid water under a thick, greenhouse-enhanced atmosphere rich in CO2, potentially resembling a super-Venus or early Martian environment. Atmospheric models indicate a 40% probability of residing in the conservative habitable zone and 51% in the optimistic zone, but a comparable chance of being entirely too cold for surface habitability without extreme greenhouse forcing. Its proximity to a relatively bright host star facilitates potential spectroscopic characterization of any atmosphere using future observatories like JWST, which could detect biosignatures from subsurface oceans or geothermal activity if present. However the planet remains an unconfirmed candidate.
