= Kate Isaak =

British astrophysicist

- Education: University of Cambridge (BA, PhD)
- Scientific career
- Workplaces: University of Cambridge; University of Cardiff; European Space Agency
- Thesis: Low-noise instrumentation and astronomical observations of high- redshift objects at submillimetre wavelengths. (1995)

Katherine Gudrun Isaak is a British astrophysicist and the Project Scientist for the European Space Agency Characterising Exoplanet Satellite mission (CHEOPS). She is based at European Space Research and Technology Centre.

== Early life and education ==
Isaak was born and raised in the United Kingdom. She is the daughter of two scientists. She attended a mixed comprehensive school where there were more girls than boys in her physics class. She has spoken about how important her high school physics and chemistry teachers were in helping her decide to become a scientist. She attended the University of Cambridge where she was a member of Murray Edwards College, Cambridge. Through her time at Cambridge Isaak was supported by W.Owen Saxton, an Emeritus Fellow of Physics who was then Director of Studies. She studied Natural Sciences and specialised in physics in her final year. She remained there for her doctoral research, where she developed instrumentation for submillimetre astronomy. Her project involved investigations into very distant galaxies. After earning her doctorate she moved to Massachusetts, where she worked as a postdoctoral research associate.

== Research and career ==
For her research she used the James Clerk Maxwell Telescope to observe high redshift quasars. This included the detection of interstellar dust in a high redshift quasar. At the time of the discovery it was the most distant detection of dust in the observable universe.

She started working with the European Space Agency in 2004 whilst working at Cardiff University. Here she supervised the doctorate of Gwenifer Raymond, who has since become a successful musician. She was part of the SPICA mission and helped to build the SPIRE instrument for the Herschel Space Observatory.

Isaak joined the European Space Agency in 2010. She is based at the European Space Research and Technology Centre (ESTEC). Isaak is the European Space Agency Project Scientist for the CHEOPS mission, designed to measure the radii of exoplanets. CHEOPS, which was selected in 2012 as the first Small-class mission in ESA's Cosmic Vision science programme, launched on 18 December 2019. She is a member of the team for the Large Interferometer for Exoplanets (LIFE) space mission.

=== Selected publications ===
Her publications include:

- Isaak, Kate G. (1 July 1994). "Observations of high-redshift objects at submillimetre wavelengths". Monthly Notices of the Royal Astronomical Society. 269: L28–L32. Bibcode:1994MNRAS.269L..28I. doi:10.1093/mnras/269.1.L28.
- Isaak, Kate G. (21 June 2004). "Submillimetre observations of z > 6 quasars". Monthly Notices of the Royal Astronomical Society. 351 (2): L28–L32. arXiv:astro-ph/0405177. Bibcode:2004MNRAS.351L..29R. doi:10.1111/j.1365-2966.2004.07923.x. S2CID 16113341.
- Isaak, Kate G. (1 January 2002). "The SCUBA Bright Quasar Survey (SBQS): 850-μm observations of the z>≳ 4 sample". Monthly Notices of the Royal Astronomical Society. 329 (1): 149–162. arXiv:astro-ph/0109438. Bibcode:2002MNRAS.329..149I. doi:10.1046/j.1365-8711.2002.04966.x. S2CID 9371669.

== See also ==
- List of women in leadership positions on astronomical instrumentation projects
