= HD 137010 =

High proper-motion star in the constellation Libra

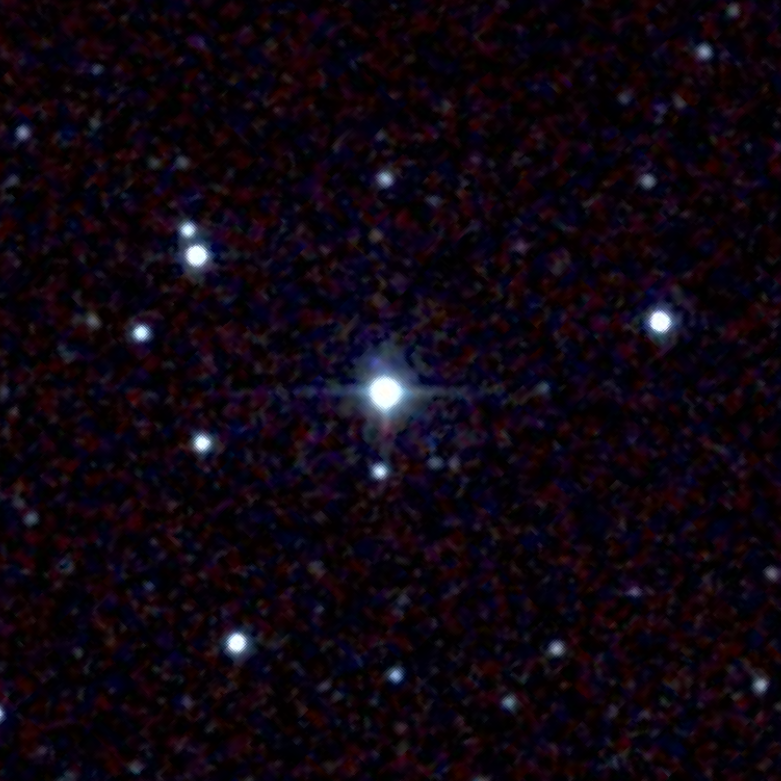
- 2MASS image of HD 137010

Observation data Epoch J2000 Equinox ICRS
- Constellation: Libra
- Right ascension: 15^{h} 24^{m} 21.25106^{s}
- Declination: −19° 44′ 21.6785″
- Apparent magnitude (V): 10.14

Characteristics
- Evolutionary stage: Main sequence
- Spectral type: K3.5 V

Astrometry
Radial velocity (R_{v})	+27.866 km/s
Proper motion (μ)	RA: +228.536 mas/yr Dec.: −248.158 mas/yr
Parallax (π)	22.2922±0.0174 mas
Distance	146.3 ± 0.1 ly (44.86 ± 0.04 pc)
Absolute magnitude (M_{V})	+7.2

Details
Mass	0.726±0.017 M_{☉}
Radius	0.707±0.023 R_{☉}
Luminosity	0.232+0.023 −0.021 L_{☉}
Surface gravity (log g)	4.60±0.03 cgs
Temperature	4,770±90 K
Metallicity [Fe/H]	-0.22 dex
Age	4.8-10 Gyr

Other designations
- BD−19 4097, HD 137010, HIP 75398, PPM 230195, EPIC 249661074, TIC 428919267

Database references
SIMBAD	data

HD 137010 is a K-type main-sequence star located approximately 146 light-years (44.86 parsecs) away in the zodiac constellation of Libra. It is a solar analog, though cooler, dimmer, and smaller than the Sun, with an apparent visual magnitude of 10.14, making it invisible to the naked eye but readily observable with a telescope. The star is notable for hosting the exoplanet candidate HD 137010 b, a potential Earth-sized exoplanet detected via a single transit in archival data from NASA's Kepler K2 mission.

== Characteristics ==
HD 137010 has a spectral type of K3.5 V, indicating that it is a main-sequence star generating energy through the thermonuclear fusion of hydrogen in its core. Its effective temperature is 4,770 ± 90 K, giving the star an orange hue. The star's mass is 0.726 ± 0.017 M_{☉}, its radius is 0.707 ± 0.023 R_{☉}, and its luminosity is 0.232+0.023
−0.021 L_{☉}. Its metallicity is slightly subsolar at [Fe/H] = −0.22 ± 0.07 dex.

The star's age is estimated between 4.8 and 10 billion years (one analysis gives 7.4 ± 2.6 Gyr), consistent with its low magnetic activity. Its surface gravity is log g = 4.60 ± 0.03 (cgs), and its density is 2.90+0.29
−0.26 g/cm³.

== Planetary system ==
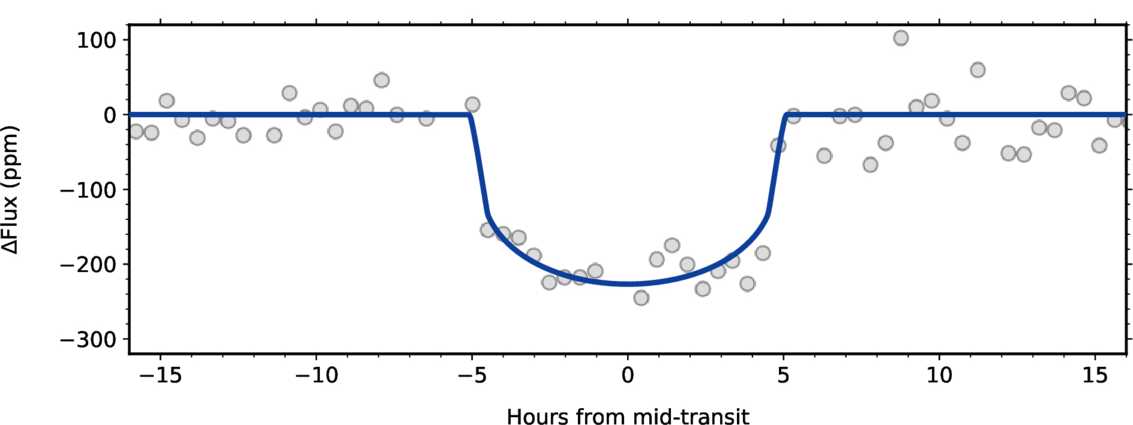
Inset focusing on the transit event

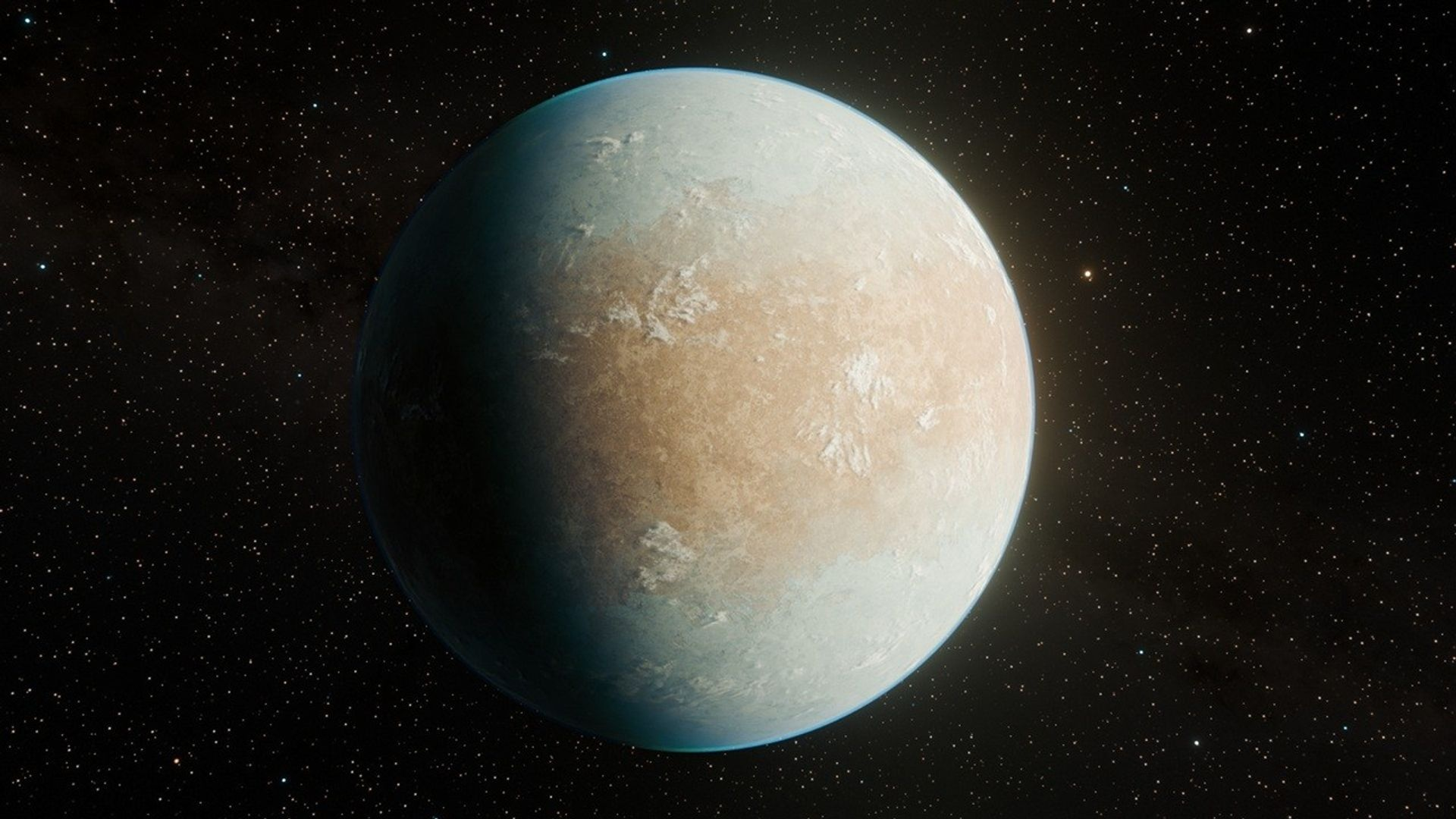
Artistic representation of exoplanet HD 137010 b

HD 137010 was observed by the Kepler space telescope for 88 days during K2 Campaign 15 (23 August to 19 November 2017). Photometry revealed a single, shallow 10-hour transit event with a depth of 225 ± 10 parts per million (ppm) and a duration of 9.76+0.21
−0.18 hours. The transit was identified through visual inspection of the light curve. Analysis of the K2 photometry, high-resolution imaging (including new speckle observations), archival radial velocities, and Gaia/Hipparcos astrometry ruled out all conventional false-positive scenarios, such as background eclipsing binaries, hierarchical triples, or instrumental artifacts. The event is best explained by a transiting planet candidate, designated HD 137010 b.

The candidate has a radius of 1.06+0.06
−0.05 R_{🜨}, consistent with a rocky Super-Earth or Earth analog. Assuming negligible orbital eccentricity, the orbital period is estimated at 355+200
−59 days, with a semi-major axis of 0.88+0.32
−0.10 AU. The planet receives an incident stellar flux of 0.29+0.11
−0.13 times that of Earth, placing it near the outer edge of the habitable zone.

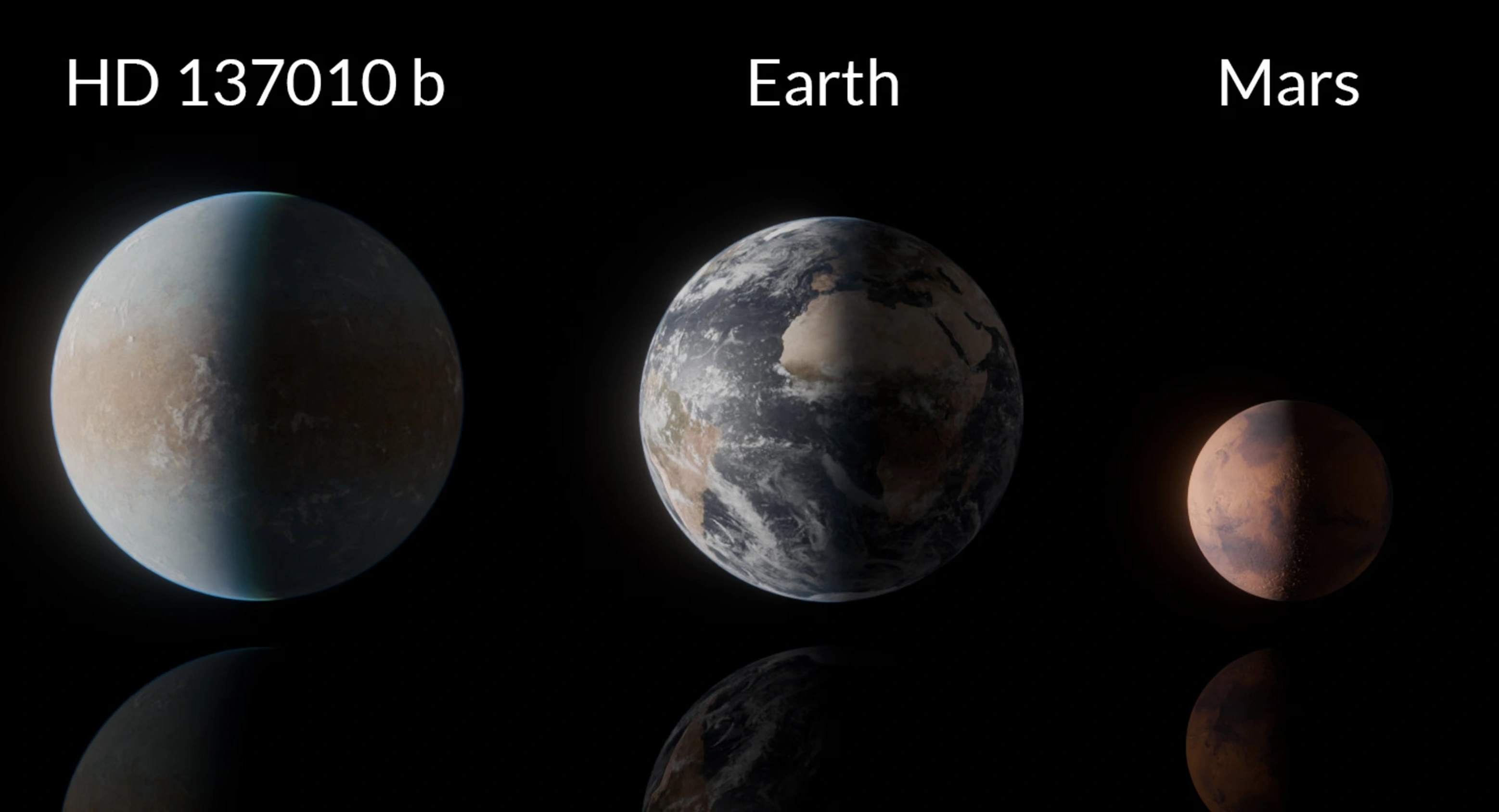
Size comparison of HD 137010 b with Earth and Mars

Its equilibrium temperature is approximately 205+17
−28 K (for a albedo of 0), potentially as low as 173 K for a higher albedo, this is colder than the average surface temperature of Mars. Models suggest a 40% probability of lying in the conservative habitable zone and 51% in the optimistic habitable zone, a thick CO₂-rich atmosphere could potentially allow liquid water despite the low insolation.

As of early 2026, HD 137010 b remains a planet candidate because only one transit has been observed, confirmation requires a second transit or supporting radial-velocity data. The host star's brightness (V = 10.14) makes it an excellent target for future follow-up observations.

The HD 137010 planetary system
Companion (in order from star)	Mass	Semimajor axis (AU)	Orbital period (days)	Eccentricity	Inclination (°)	Radius
b (unconfirmed)	—	0.88+0.3 −0.1	355.0+200.0 −59.0	0	>89.82+0.05 −0.03°	1.06+0.06 −0.05 R_{🜨}
