= 2025 MN45 =

Rapidly rotating main-belt asteroid

2025 MN_{45}
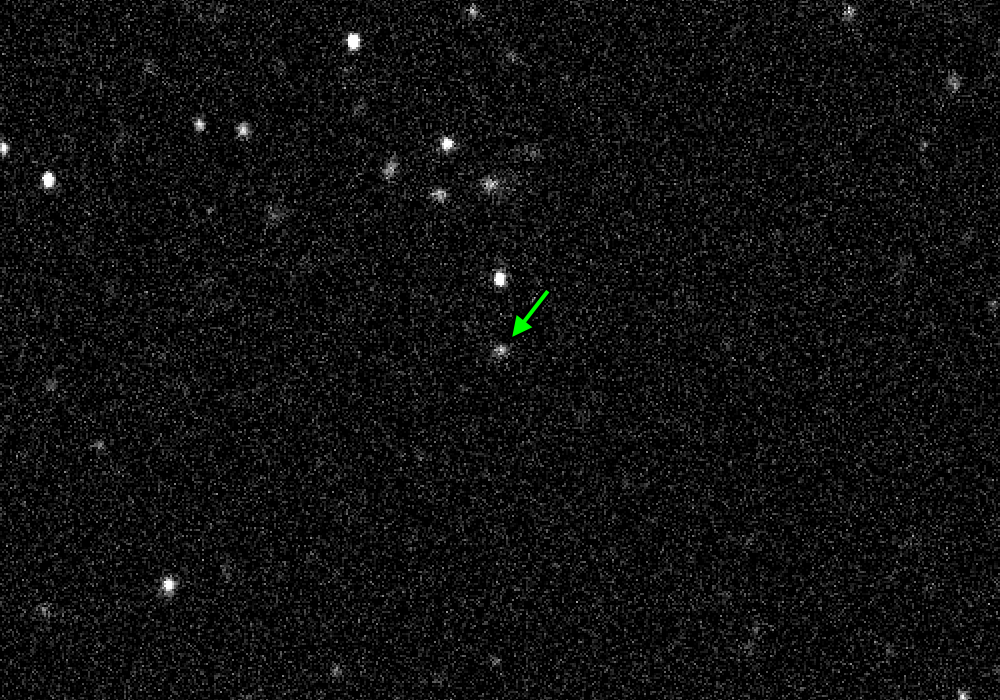
- 2025 MN_{45} imaged by Cerro Tololo Observatory's Dark Energy Camera on 2 March 2017

Discovery
- Discovered by: Simonyi Survey Telescope
- Discovery site: Vera C. Rubin Observatory
- Discovery date: 2 May 2025

Designations
- Minor planet category: main belt

Orbital characteristics
- Epoch 21 November 2025 (JD 2461000.5)
- Uncertainty parameter 0
- Observation arc: 5.60 yr (2,047 days)
- Earliest precovery date: 26 September 2019
- Aphelion: 2.491 AU
- Perihelion: 2.388 AU
- Semi-major axis: 2.439 AU
- Eccentricity: 0.0210
- Orbital period (sidereal): 3.81 yr (1,392 d)
- Mean anomaly: 95.679°
- Mean motion: 0° 15^{m} 31.352^{s} / day
- Inclination: 9.852°
- Longitude of ascending node: 54.262°
- Argument of perihelion: 98.697°

Physical characteristics
- Dimensions: ≃0.87 × 0.66 km (minimum)
- Mean diameter: ≃0.71 km
- Synodic rotation period: ≃1.88 min
- Geometric albedo: 0.15 (assumed)
- Spectral type: g–r = 0.42–0.43; r–i = 0.13–0.14
- Absolute magnitude (H): 18.74±0.20

2025 MN_{45} is a rapidly rotating main-belt asteroid 0.71 kilometers (0.44 mi) in diameter, discovered by the Vera C. Rubin Observatory on 2 May 2025. It has the shortest known rotation period of any asteroid with a diameter larger than 0.5 km (0.31 mi) as of 2026, completing one rotation approximately every 1.88 minutes. The extreme spin rate of 2025 MN_{45} indicates that it is not a rubble pile, but is instead made of a strong material like solid rock which prevents centrifugal forces from breaking it apart.

== Discovery ==
2025 MN_{45} was discovered by the Vera C. Rubin Observatory's 8.4-meter (28 ft) Simonyi Survey Telescope on 2 May 2025, during the commissioning of its main telescope camera (LSSTCam). It is one of the ~1,900 asteroids discovered by the observatory during its "First Look" program, which detected them via frequent imaging of the Virgo Cluster from April to May 2025. The discovery of these asteroids including 2025 MN_{45} was announced by Vera C. Rubin Observatory team in June 2025, with the observation data submitted to the Minor Planet Center. Further analysis of Vera C. Rubin Observatory's "First Look" observations revealed that 2025 MN_{45} had a rapid rotation, which was announced on 7 January 2026 by a team of astronomers led by Sarah Greenstreet. 2025 MN_{45} has been detected by the Pan-STARRS survey in earlier observations from 2019, 2021, and 2023.

== Orbit ==
2025 MN_{45} orbits the Sun at an average distance or semi-major axis of 2.49 astronomical units (AU), which places it in the main asteroid belt between Mars and Jupiter. It completes one orbit around the Sun every 3.81 years. The asteroid follows a nearly circular orbit with a low orbital eccentricity of 0.02 and an inclination of 9.9° with respect to the ecliptic.

== Physical properties ==
2025 MN_{45} has an estimated diameter of 710 m (0.44 mi; 2,330 ft), which was determined from its absolute magnitude of 18.7 and an assumed geometric albedo of 0.15. Analysis of Vera C. Rubin Observatory's April–May 2025 observations has shown that 2025 MN_{45} has color indices of g–r = 0.42–0.43 and r–i = 0.13–0.14, which appear to match more closely with C-type asteroids than S-type asteroids. (Note: Greenstreet et al. (2026) do not explicitly compare or describe 2025 MN_{45}'s color indices, but their values can be compared to the color index plot shown in Figure 16, where the authors discuss which color index values correspond to C-type and S-type.) The observations also show that 2025 MN_{45}'s brightness fluctuates with an amplitude of 0.4 magnitudes, indicating that it has an elongated shape with an axial elongation of at least 1.3 (corresponding to dimensions of 0.87 × 0.66 km).

=== Rotation ===
Rotational light curve of 2025 MN_{45} measured by the Vera C. Rubin Observatory, showing changes in the asteroid's brightness as it rotates

The brightness of 2025 MN_{45} periodically changes due to its rotation. Analysis of Vera C. Rubin Observatory's April–May 2025 observations found that 2025 MN_{45} rotates every 1.88 minutes, making it the fastest rotating asteroid with a diameter larger than 500 m (1,600 ft) as of 2026. Main-belt asteroids with diameters larger than 150 m (490 ft) are generally expected to rotate slower than about 2.2 hours (a threshold known as the spin barrier), as centrifugal forces would cause a loosely bound object (like a rubble pile) to break apart. The fact that 2025 MN_{45} rotates far faster than the 2.2-hour spin barrier implies that it is not a rubble pile like most asteroids, but is instead made of a very strong material with substantial internal cohesion. The cohesive strength required to keep 2025 MN_{45} intact against centrifugal forces is roughly 9 megapascals (MPa), comparable to that of solid rock (≈10 MPa).

In addition to 2025 MN_{45}, two other "ultrafast"-rotating asteroids with diameters larger than 100 m (330 ft) and rotation periods shorter than 5 minutes were discovered in the same Vera C. Rubin Observatory study, (Note: Ultrafast-rotating asteroids discovered in Vera C. Rubin Observatory's "First Look" observations include 2025 MN_{45} (~0.71 km diameter, 1.18 min period), 2025 MJ71 (~0.12 km diameter, 1.92 min period) and 2025 MK41 (~0.54 km diameter, 3.78 min period).) suggesting that they might be prevalent. These ultrafast rotators may have originated as fragments from the collisional destruction of a larger parent body's dense core.

== See also ==
- List of fast rotators (minor planets)
