= Daraxonrasib =

Medication

Clinical data
- Trade names: Rasonque
- Other names: RMC-6236
- AHFS/Drugs.com: Monograph
- MedlinePlus: a626099
- License data: US DailyMed: Daraxonrasib
- Routes of administration: By mouth
- Drug class: Antineoplastic
- ATC code: None

Legal status
- Legal status: US: ℞-only; EU: Rx-only

Identifiers
- IUPAC name: (1S,2S)-N-[(1^{2}M,4S,6^{3}S)-1^{1}-ethyl-1^{2}-{2-[(1S)-1-methoxyethyl]-5-(4-methylpiperazin-1-yl)pyridin-3-yl}-10,10-dimethyl-5,7-dioxo-1^{1}H-8-oxa-1(5,3)-indola-6(1,3)-[1,2]diazinana-2(4,2)-[1,3]thiazolacycloundecaphan-4-yl]-2-methylcyclopropane-1-carboxamide
- CAS Number: 2765081-21-6
- PubChem CID: 164726578
- IUPHAR/BPS: 13368
- ChemSpider: 115275938
- UNII: B6T47Y2UAP
- KEGG: D13265
- ChEBI: CHEBI:746946

Chemical and physical data
- Formula: C_{44}H_{58}N_{8}O_{5}S
- Molar mass: 811.06 g·mol^{−1}
- 3D model (JSmol): Interactive image
- SMILES: CCN1C2=C3C=C(C=C2)C4=CSC(=N4)C[C@@H](C(=O)N5CCC[C@H](N5)C(=O)OCC(CC3=C1C6=C(N=CC(=C6)N7CCN(CC7)C)[C@H](C)OC)(C)C)NC(=O)[C@H]8C[C@@H]8C
- InChI: InChI=1S/C44H58N8O5S/c1-8-51-37-12-11-28-19-31(37)33(40(51)32-20-29(23-45-39(32)27(3)56-7)50-16-14-49(6)15-17-50)22-44(4,5)25-57-43(55)34-10-9-13-52(48-34)42(54)35(21-38-46-36(28)24-58-38)47-41(53)30-18-26(30)2/h11-12,19-20,23-24,26-27,30,34-35,48H,8-10,13-18,21-22,25H2,1-7H3,(H,47,53)/t26-,27-,30-,34-,35-/m0/s1; Key:FVICRBSEYSHKFY-JYQNNKODSA-N

Daraxonrasib, sold under the brand name Rasonque, is an anti-cancer medication used for the treatment of pancreatic cancer. It is an inhibitor of the RAS GTPase family. It is given by mouth.

It is a small molecule RAS inhibitor of all three key members of the Ras superfamily: KRAS, HRAS, and NRAS. The three RAS proteins are GTPases that become active when bound to GTP but normally convert this GTP to GDP and thereby become inactive. RAS proteins that are bound to GDP and GTP are termed respectively RAS(OFF) and RAS(ON). It targets RAS in the ON state, but not in the OFF state.

Daraxonrasib was approved for medical use in the United States in August 2026. It was developed by Revolution Medicines.

== Medical uses ==
Daraxonrasib is indicated for the treatment of adults with metastatic pancreatic adenocarcinoma who have received at least one prior systemic therapy or who are not candidates for multiagent systemic therapy.

== Side effects ==
In clinical study and through expanded access case studies, the safety profile of daraxonrasib appears to be relatively manageable. The most predominant side effects observed as of June/July 2026 include rash, diarrhea, fatigue, nausea, split fingertips, mucositis and stomatitis.

== Pharmacology ==
=== Mechanism of action ===
Daraxonrasib is a small molecule which inhibits proteins of the RAS superfamily. It is a molecular glue which noncovalently binds RAS proteins in the ON state. To inhibit RAS, daraxonrasib first binds a chaperone molecule (cyclophilin A), which results in a complementary surface. This surface is able to bind RAS superfamily proteins, forming a tri-complex and thereby blocking RAS signaling and limiting RAS-driven cancer growth.

=== RAS proteins ===
The RAS proteins are expressed on the inner surface of a cell's plasma membrane and to lesser extents the cell's intracellular Golgi apparatus, endoplasmic reticulum, and endosome membranes. RAS proteins can develop mutations that cause them to bind GTP continuously, keeping them constantly in the ON state, causing uncontrolled growth, and thereby promoting various malignancies. Patients with a cancer harboring RAS-activating mutation generally have poorer prognoses and shorter survival time than patients with the same cancer but without a RAS mutation.

Daraxonrasib reverses continuous activation of RAS by forming a tri-complex consisting of one of the three RAS proteins bound to GTP and cyclophilin A, and thus inhibiting RAS. Consequently, daraxonrasib has proven effective in suppressing the cancers promoted by any one of RAS superfamily proteins.

A mutationally active RAS protein occurs in one out of every 5 human cancers, promotes up to 30% of human cancers, and in the U.S. appears responsible for 200,000 new cancer cases each year. One of the three RAS proteins is mutated in about 90% of pancreatic ductal adenocarcinomas; 40% of colorectal adenocarcinomas; 30% of skin cutaneous melanomas; ~30% of cases of non-small cell lung cancer; and a smaller proportion of most other solid tumor types.

== Society and culture ==
=== Legal status ===
Daraxonrasib was approved for medical use in the United States in August 2026.

In October 2026, the Committee for Medicinal Products for Human Use of the European Medicines Agency adopted a positive opinion, recommending the granting of a marketing authorization for the medicinal product Rasonque, intended as monotherapy for the treatment of adults with metastatic pancreatic adenocarcinoma who have received at least one prior systemic therapy. The applicant for this medicinal product is Revolution Medicines Netherlands. Daraxonrasib was authorized for medical use in the European Union in November 2026.

=== Names ===
Daraxonrasib is the international nonproprietary name.

Daraxonrasib is sold under the brand name Rasonque.
