= CHEOPS =

European optical space telescope launched in 2019

Characterising Exoplanets Satellite (CHEOPS)
- An artist's impression of the CHEOPS space observatory
- Mission type: Exoplanetology, astrophysics
- Operator: Swiss Space Office / ESA
- COSPAR ID: 2019-092B
- SATCAT no.: 44874
- Website: cheops.unibe.ch sci.esa.int/cheops
- Mission duration: 3.5 years (nominal) + 3 years (extended); Elapsed: 6 years, 8 months and 5 days (in progress)

Spacecraft properties
- Spacecraft type: Space observatory
- Bus: SEOSAT
- Manufacturer: Airbus Defence and Space (Spain)
- Launch mass: 273 kg
- Payload mass: 58 kg
- Dimensions: 1.5 × 1.5 × 1.5 m (4 ft 11 in × 4 ft 11 in × 4 ft 11 in)
- Power: 200 watts

Start of mission
- Launch date: 18 December 2019, 08:54:20 UTC
- Rocket: Soyuz-ST-A/Fregat-M (Soyuz VS23)
- Launch site: Centre Spatial Guyanais, ELS
- Contractor: Arianespace

Orbital parameters
- Reference system: Geocentric orbit
- Regime: Sun-synchronous orbit
- Perigee altitude: 686.1 km (426.3 mi)
- Apogee altitude: 702.5 km (436.5 mi)
- Inclination: 98.2°
- Period: 98.5 minutes

Main telescope
- Type: Ritchey–Chrétien frame-transfer back-side illuminated CCD
- Diameter: 32 cm
- Focal ratio: f/8
- Wavelengths: 330 to 1100 nm

Transponders
- Capacity: 1.2 Gbit/day downlink

Instruments
- Photometer
- ESA insignia Cosmic Vision (Science Programme)

CHEOPS (Characterising Exoplanets Satellite) is a European space telescope. Its objective is to determine the size of known extrasolar planets, which will allow the estimation of their mass, density, composition and their formation. Launched on 18 December 2019, it is the first Small-class mission in ESA's Cosmic Vision science programme. The small satellite features an optical Ritchey–Chrétien telescope with an aperture of 30 cm, mounted on a standard small satellite platform. It was placed into a Sun-synchronous orbit of about 700 km altitude.

For the planned mission duration of 3.5 years, CHEOPS is to measure the size of known transiting exoplanets orbiting bright and nearby stars, as well as search for predicted transits of exoplanets previously discovered via radial velocity. Scientists behind the project expect these well-characterised transiting exoplanets to be prime targets for observatories such as James Webb Space Telescope (JWST) or the extremely large telescopes. In 2023, the mission was extended to 2026. During the extended mission CHEOPS is expected to also search for exomoons. CHEOPS also sees trails from other satellites during its observations, since it is in low Earth orbit.

== Spacecraft ==
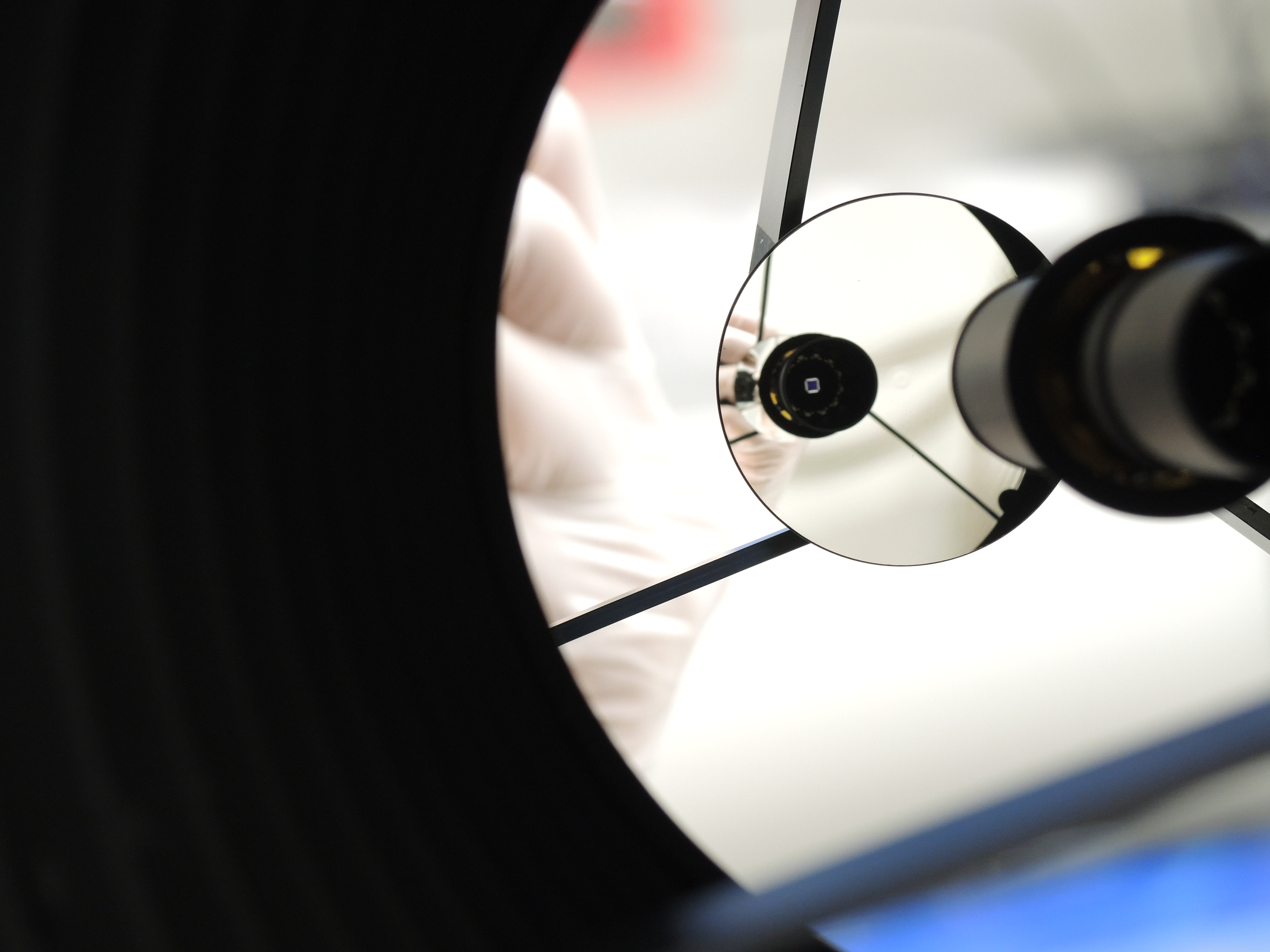
The CHEOPS' mirror

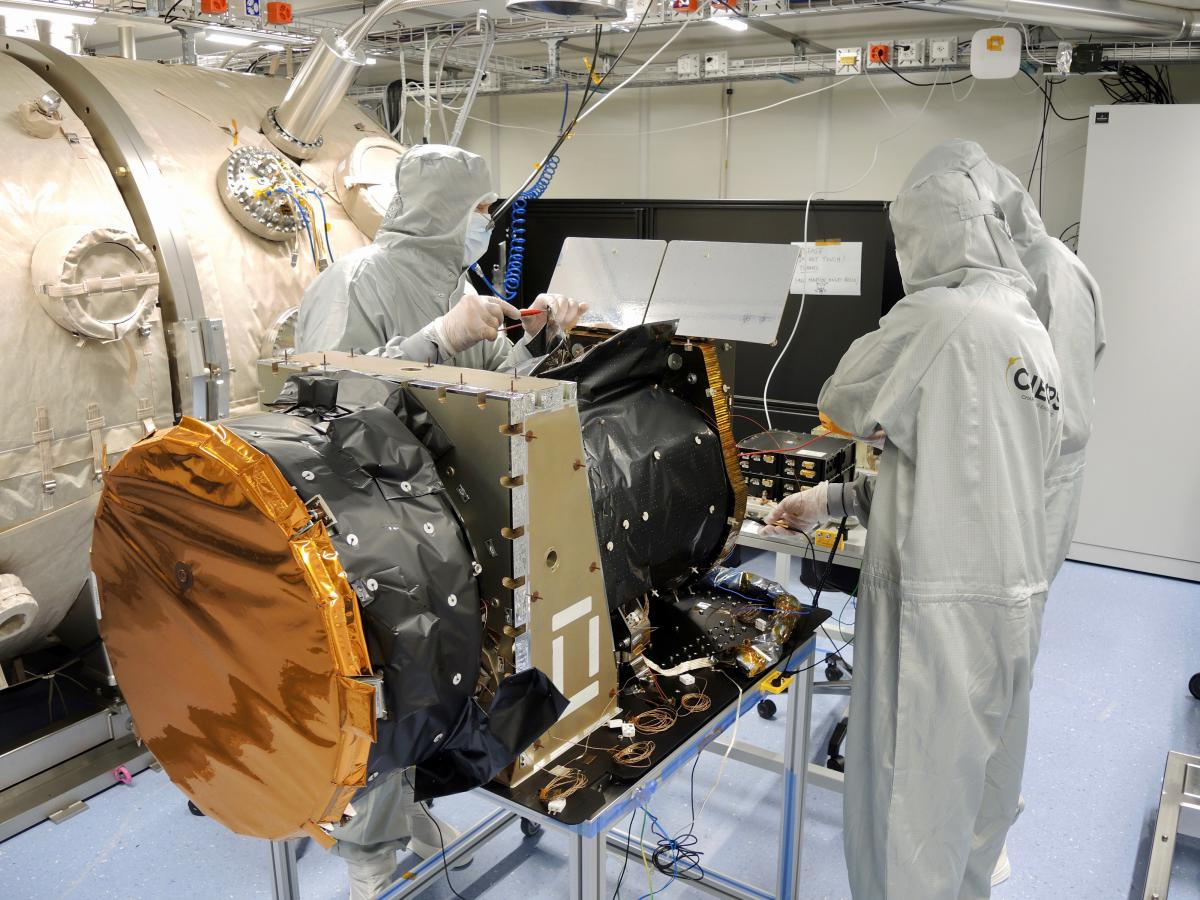
The spacecraft during testing

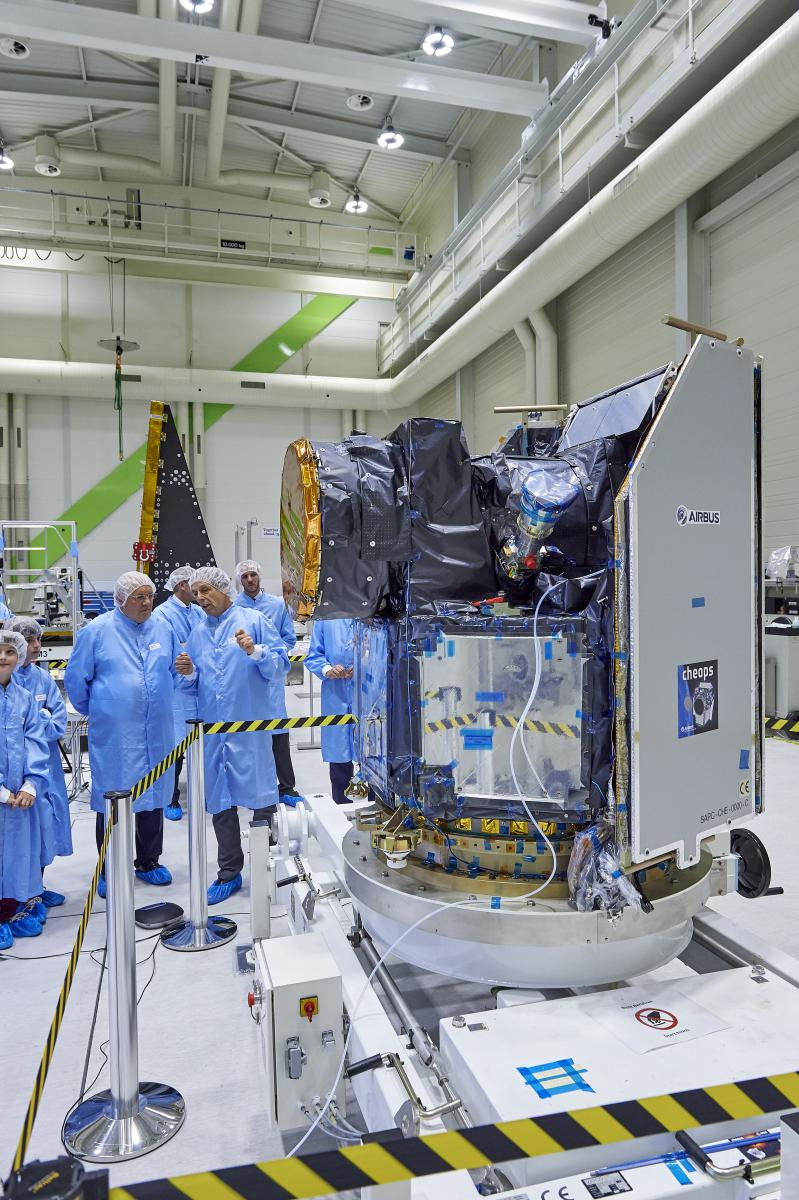
The spacecraft

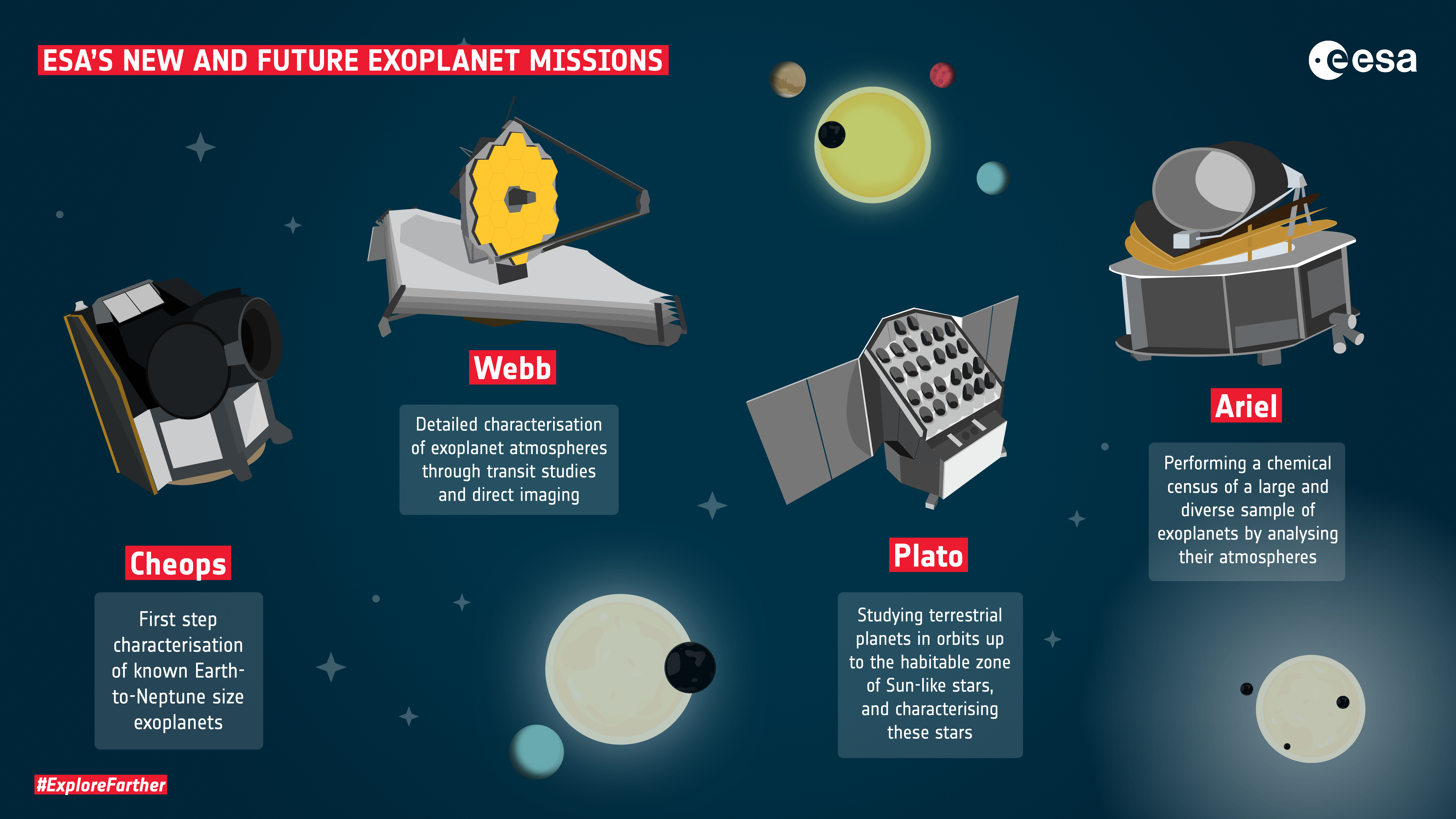
ESA's exoplanet missions: CHEOPS, JWST, PLATO, and ARIEL

The satellite has dimensions of approximately 1.5 × 1.5 × 1.5 m (4 ft 11 in × 4 ft 11 in × 4 ft 11 in) and a hexagonal base structure. The satellite bus of the CHEOPS spacecraft is based on the SEOSAT platform.

The spacecraft is powered by solar panels that are also part of its sunshield. They provide 60 W continuous power for instrument operations and allow for at least a 1.2 gigabit/day data downlink capacity. A sunshield mounted on the platform protects the radiator and detector housing against the Sun, and it also features solar panels for the electrical power subsystem. The sunshield wraps around the hexagonal bus.

The control system is 3-axis stabilized, but nadir locked, ensuring that one of the spacecraft axes is always pointing towards the Earth. During each orbit, the spacecraft slowly rotates around the telescope line-of-sight to keep the focal plane radiator oriented towards cold space, enabling passive cooling of the detector. The typical observation duration is 48 hours. During a typical 48-hour observation CHEOPS has a pointing stability of better than eight arcsec at 95% confidence.

Two titanium plaques with thousands of miniaturised drawings by children have been fixed to CHEOPS. Each plaque measures nearly 18 × 24 cm (7.1 × 9.4 in). The plaques, prepared by a team at the Bern University of Applied Sciences were unveiled in a dedicated ceremony at RUAG on 27 August 2018. The individual drawings can be found at the website of CHEOPS by clicking on a map of Europe.

== Instruments ==
The detector, support electronics, telescope, back-end optics, instrument computer, and thermal regulation hardware are known collectively as the CHEOPS Instrument System (CIS).

The required photometric precision is achieved using a single frame-transfer, back-illuminated Charge-coupled device (CCD) detector from Teledyne e2v with 1024 × 1024 pixels and a pixel pitch of 13 μm. The CCD is mounted in the focal plane of the telescope, and is passively cooled to 233 K (−40 °C), with a thermal stability of 10 mK.

The telescope is a single medium-size f/8, on-axis Ritchey-Chrétien telescope with a 32 cm (13 in) aperture, mounted on a stiff optical bench. The University of Geneva and the University of Bern provided the powerful photometer. Target star images are deliberately defocussed to help accurate photometry.

== Objectives ==
Thousands of exoplanets have been discovered by the end of the 2010s; some have minimum mass measurements from the radial velocity method while others that are seen to transit their parent stars have measures of their physical size. Few exoplanets to date have highly accurate measures for both mass and radius, limiting the ability to study the variety in bulk density that would provide clues as to what materials they are made of and their formation history.

The main goal of CHEOPS is the accurate measurement of the size (radii) of the exoplanets for which ground-based spectroscopic surveys have already provided mass estimates. Knowing both the mass and the size of the exoplanets will allow scientists to determine the planets' density and thus their approximate composition, such as whether they are gaseous or rocky. CHEOPS is the most efficient instrument to search for shallow transits and to determine accurate radii for known exoplanets in the super-Earth to Neptune mass range (1–6 Earth radius).

CHEOPS measures photometric signals with a precision limited by stellar photon noise of 150 ppm/min for a 9th magnitude star. This corresponds to the transit of an Earth-sized planet orbiting a star of 0.9 R_{☉} in 60 days detected with a S/N_{transit} >10 (100 ppm transit depth). For example, an Earth-size transit across a G star creates an 80 ppm depth.

The different science objectives require 500 separate target pointings. Assuming 1 hour per pointing the mission duration is estimated at 1175 days or 3.2 years. Together with the 20% of open time available for the community the total duration of the CHEOPS mission is estimated to be 3.5 years.

== Priorities ==
Eighty per cent of the science observing time on CHEOPS is dedicated to the CHEOPS Guaranteed Time Observing (GTO) Programme, under the responsibility of the CHEOPS Science Team chaired by Didier Queloz. The majority of the GTO programme involves the characterization of known transiting exoplanets and improvement of known parameters. Part of the GTO programme is to find transits of known exoplanets that were confirmed by other techniques, such as radial-velocity, but not by the transit-method. Another part of the GTO programme includes exploration of multi-systems and search of additional planets in those systems, for example using the transit-timing-variation (TTV) method.

The other 20% of the science observing time on CHEOPS is made available to the scientific community in the form of an ESA-run Guest Observers' (GO) Programme. Researchers can submit proposals for observations with CHEOPS through an annual Announcements of Opportunity (AO) Program. The approved AO-1 projects include observations of the Hot Jupiters HD 17156 b, Kelt-22A b, warm jupiter K2-139b, multi systems GJ 9827, K2-138, the exoplanet DS Tuc Ab, 55 Cancri e, WASP-189 b and other exoplanet science related observations, such as planets around rapidly-rotating stars, planet material around white dwarfs and searching for transiting exocomets around 5 Vulpeculae.

== Timeline ==
=== Prior to launch ===
Organized as a partnership between the European Space Agency (ESA) and the Swiss Space Office, CHEOPS was selected in October 2012 from among 26 proposals as the first S-class ("small") space mission in ESA's Cosmic Vision programme. ESA is the mission architect and responsible for the spacecraft and launch opportunity procurement. The project is led by the Center for Space and Habitability at the University of Bern, Switzerland, with contributions from other Swiss and European universities. The principal investigator for the science instrument is Willy Benz at the University of Bern and the principal scientist from ESA is Kate Isaak. After a competition phase, Airbus Defence and Space in Spain was selected as the spacecraft builder. The ESA mission cost is capped at €50 million. Media Lario S.r.l. (Italy) was responsible for the optical finishing of the primary optical element.

=== Launch ===
CHEOPS launched on board of a Soyuz-STA launch vehicle on 18 December 2019, at 08:54:20 UTC from Centre Spatial Guyanais (CSG) in Kourou, French Guiana. CHEOPS separated after two hours and 23 minutes from lift-off. The primary payload was the first satellite of ASI's COSMO-SkyMed Second Generation constellation, CSG 1. The launcher also deployed three CubeSats, including ESA's OPS-SAT. CHEOPS went into a 712 km (442 mi) altitude Sun-synchronous polar orbit.

=== First light ===
After the cover of the telescope was opened on 29 January 2020, CHEOPS took its first light image on 7 February 2020. The image is centred on the star HD 70843, a yellow-white star located around 150 light years away. The star was selected because of its brightness and position on the sky. The stars in the image are blurry, which is intended. The defocused mirror distributes the light of the star over many pixels of the detector, making the measurements of starlight more precise. The first light images were better than it was expected from tests in the laboratory. The images were smoother and more symmetrical, which could reduce noise caused by the detector and the spacecraft. In April 2020, the telescope began science operations.

=== Results ===
- In 2020, a study of WASP-189b (a 'hot Jupiter') has been published
- In 2021, TOI-178 has been found to have 6 planets, 5 having orbital resonances. Planetary densities have been calculated
- In 2021, CHEOPS supplemented by TESS data characterized AU Mic and its planet b. It also confirmed transit-timing variations, caused by the outer planets
- In 2022, HD 108236 f was discovered with CHEOPS
- TOI-561 is a multi-planet system that was studied with CHEOPS, HARPS-N, and TESS. A study published in 2022 has shown that TOI-561 b is the lowest density ultra-short period planet known so far
- In 2023, CHEOPS observed occultations caused by the planet 55 Cancri e and was able to observe individual occultations for the first time
- A study searching for transits around 6 white dwarfs did not detect any transits and a study to search for exomoons around v^{2} Lupi d was unable to detect any additional transits. The full transit of v^{2} Lupi d was observed for the first time with CHEOPS, potentially aiding any future searches for exomoons around this planet
- In February 2026, using CHEOPS observations, scientists described a unique configuration of a planetary system around the star LHS 1903, where the innermost and outermost planets are rocky, while the two middle planets have extended atmospheres. This provided support for the inside-out model of planet formation.

== See also ==
- List of European Space Agency programmes and missions
- List of exoplanet search projects
- List of space telescopes
- CoRoT – European space telescope that operated between 2006 - 2014
- Kepler space telescope – NASA space telescope for exoplanetology (2009–2018)
- MOST – Canada's first space telescope
- PLATO – European space telescope to detect exoplanets
- TESS – NASA satellite of the Explorer program
