= Living Planet Index =

Global biodiversity index

The World Wildlife Fund's Living Planet Report 2022 found that wildlife populations declined by an average 69% since 1970.

The Living Planet Index (LPI) is an indicator of the state of global biodiversity, based on trends in vertebrate populations of species from around the world. The Zoological Society of London (ZSL) manages the index in cooperation with the World Wide Fund for Nature (WWF). It is considered one of the most widely recognized global indicators for tracking changes in biodiversity over time.

The index was first conceived in 1997 where its primary goal was developing a way to measure changes in the Earth's biodiversity overtime. As of 2022, the index is statistically created from journal studies, online databases and government reports for 31,821 populations of 5,230 species of mammal, bird, reptile, amphibian and fish.

== Results ==
According to the 2024 report, monitored wildlife populations showed a 73% average decline in size between 1970 and 2020, compared with a 69% average decline over 1970–2018 reported in the 2022 edition, suggesting that natural ecosystems are degrading at a rate unprecedented in human history Many trends are consistent with broader global assessments that identify biodiversity loss as one of the most significant environmental challenges currently affecting ecosystems worldwide. The extent of declines varies with geographic region, with monitored vertebrate populations in Latin America and the Caribbean experiencing average declines of 94%. One of the key drivers of declines has been identified as land-use change and the associated habitat loss and degradation, often linked to unsustainable agriculture, logging, or other development. Additional pressures such as climate change, pollution, and overexploitation can interact with land-use change to further accelerate declines in wildlife population.

The 2024 updated report showed an average decline of 73% between 1970 and 2020.

=== Calculation ===
The Living Planet Database (LPD) has been available online since 2013, and has been maintained by ZSL since 2016. The LPD contains more than 30,000 population trends for more than 5,200 species of fish, amphibians, reptiles, birds and mammals.

The global LPI is calculated using these population time-series, which are gathered from a variety of sources such as journals, online databases and government reports. The index is limited to vertebrate species, largely because long-term population data for invertebrates and plants are less widely available.

A generalized additive modelling framework is used to determine the underlying trend in each population time-series. Average rates of change are calculated and aggregated to the species level. Recent methodological developments have aimed to improve the robustness of the index by accounting for uneven data availability across regions and taxa.

Each species trend is aggregated to produce an index for the terrestrial, marine and freshwater systems. This process uses a weighted geometric mean method which places most weight on the largest (most species-rich) groups within a biogeographic realm. This is done to counteract the uneven spatial and taxonomic distribution of data in the LPD. The three system indices are then averaged to produce the global LPI. Despite these adjustments, challenges remain in ensuring that the index accurately reflects biodiversity patterns in underrepresented regions.

Ongoing improvements to the index continue to focus on increasing data coverage and reducing bias across taxa and geographic regions.

=== Criticism ===
Since most of the data used in the calculation is species or region specific, it has been noted that the index contains taxonomic, geographic, and temporal gaps and biases and is thus not entirely reliable. These limitations have led researchers to emphasize the importance of cautious interpretation when using the index to represent global biodiversity trends.

The fact that "all decreases in population size, regardless of whether they bring a population close to extinction, are equally accounted for" has been noted as a limitation.

In 2005, WWF authors identified that the population data was potentially unrepresentative. As of 2009, the database was found to contain too much bird data and gaps in the population coverage of tropical species, although it showed "little evidence of bias toward threatened species". The 2016 report was criticized by a professor at Duke University for over-representing western Europe, where more data were available. Talking to National Geographic, he criticised the attempt to combine data from different regions and ecosystems into a single figure, arguing that such reports are likely motivated by a desire to grab attention and raise money. Subsequent studies have further shown that differences in data availability across regions can influence the magnitude of reported declines.

A 2017 investigation of the index by members of the ZSL team published in PLOS One found higher declines than had been estimated, and indications that in areas where less data is available, species might be declining more quickly.

In 2020, a re-analysis of the baseline data by McGill University showed that the overall estimated trend of a decline by 60% since 1970 was driven by less than 3% of the studied populations; when some outliers of extreme decline are removed, the decline still exists but is considerably less catastrophic, and when more outliers (roughly amounting to 2.4% of the populations) are removed, the trend shifts to that of a decline between the 1980s and 2000s, but a roughly positive trend after 2000. This extreme sensitivity to outliers indicates that the present approach of the Living Planet Index may be flawed. This sensitivity to extreme population changes has raised concerns about how representative the index is of overall global biodiversity trends. The 2020 re-analysis has been criticized for methodological flaws and for "downplaying biodiversity loss".

A 2021 study showed that the additive framework of the calculation meant that it did not account for random population fluctuations. This resulted in biases that showed decline even when populations were stable and imprecise estimates. Such findings suggest that methodological choices in index construction can substantially influence perceived trends in biodiversity change.

A 2022 study writes because of the way the index is calculated, it is not an accurate indicator of abundance. This has contributed to ongoing debate about whether the index reflects true changes in abundance or primarily captures relative trends in population data.

A 2024 study by Charles University focused on calculation method, found that calculation of the Living Planet Index is biased by several mathematical issues, leading to overestimation of vertebrate population declines. When those mathematical issues are fixed, the majority of studied vertebrate populations shows balanced decline and growth (the only exception are the populations of amphibians, where the numbers show steady decline).

== Publication ==
The index was originally developed in 1997 by the World Wide Fund for Nature (WWF) in collaboration with the World Conservation Monitoring Centre (UNEP-WCMC), the biodiversity assessment and policy implementation arm of the United Nations Environment Programme. WWF first published the index in 1998. Since 2006, the Zoological Society of London (ZSL) manages the index in cooperation with WWF.

Results are presented biennially in the WWF Living Planet Report and in publications such as the Millennium Ecosystem Assessment and the UN Global Biodiversity Outlook. National and regional reports are now being produced to focus on relevant issues at a smaller scale. The latest edition of the Living Planet Report was released in October 2024.

== Coverage ==
WWF communications saw the index as a powerful tool able to bring about public and political conservation on biodiversity loss and conservation through a single takeaway message. This simplified communication approach has made the index widely used in public and policy discussions, although it can sometimes lead to misinterpretation of what the data represent.

The index is often misinterpreted in the media, with incorrect suggestions that it shows we have lost 69% of all animals or species since 1970. This widespread misinterpretation has led to several articles being published which detail what the LPI does and doesn't show, and how to correctly interpret the trend. Clarifying how the index should be interpreted has become an important focus in recent scientific and public discussions.

== Convention on Biological Diversity ==
The index has played an important role in policy decision making, and as a way to assess progress toward various targets set out during various multilateral conventions and agreements. It is frequently used to evaluate progress toward international biodiversity targets and inform conservation strategies.

In April 2002, and again in 2006, at the Convention on Biological Diversity (CBD), 188 nations committed themselves to actions to: "… achieve, by 2010, a significant reduction of the current rate of biodiversity loss at the global, regional and national levels…"

The LPI played a pivotal role in measuring progress towards the CBD's 2010 target. It has also been adopted by the CBD as an indicator of progress towards its Nagoya Protocol 2011-2020 targets 5, 6, and 12 (part of the Aichi Biodiversity Targets). As a result, the index has become an important tool for tracking global biodiversity commitments over time.

Informing the CBD 2020 strategic plan, the Indicators and Assessments Unit at ZSL is concerned with ensuring the most rigorous and robust methods are implemented for the measurement of population trends, expanding the coverage of the LPI to more broadly represent biodiversity, and disaggregating the index in meaningful ways (such as assessing the changes in exploited or invasive species).

== See also ==
- Living Planet Report
- Millennium Development Goals
- Sustainable development
- Sustainable Development Goals
