= Living Planet Report =

Report published by the World Wide Fund for Nature

The Living Planet Report is published every two years by the World Wide Fund for Nature since 1998. It is based on the Living Planet Index and ecological footprint calculations.

The Living Planet Report is the world's leading, science-based analysis, on the health of our planet and the impact of human activity. Humanity's demands exceed the Earth's capacity to sustain us.

The 2018 report found a "decline of 60% in population sizes" of vertebrate species overall from 1970 to 2014. The tropics of South and Central America had an 89% loss compared to 1970. These claims have been criticized by some studies such as the research group led by Brian Leung and including Maria Dornelas.

The 2018 report calls for new goals post-2020 alongside those of the Convention on Biological Diversity, the Paris Climate Agreement and the Sustainable Development Goals. The 2020 report says systemic changes are necessary to stop the destruction of global wildlife populations, including a complete overhaul of food production and consumption industries, along with making global trade more sustainable and removing deforestation completely from global supply chains.

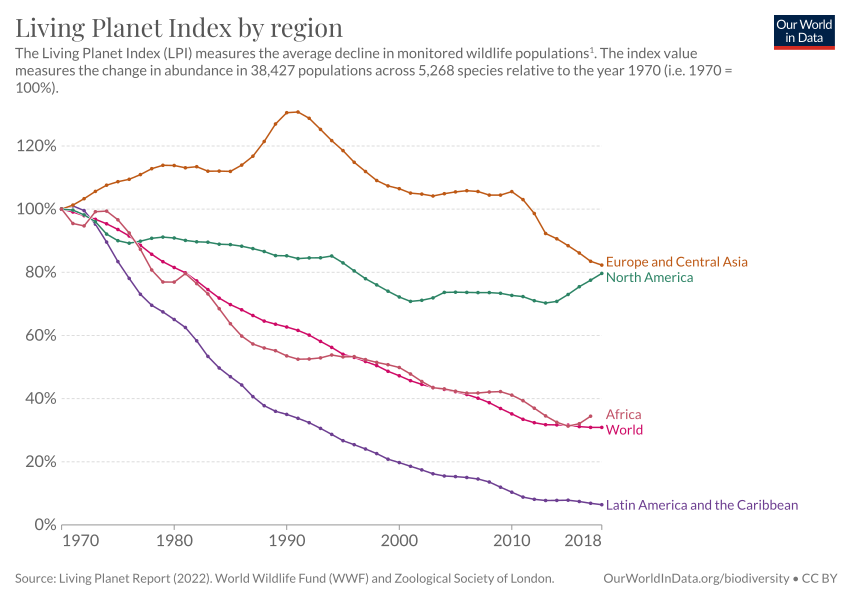
"Living Planet Index by region" with data from the report

The 2022 report found that vertebrate wildlife populations have declined by an average of almost 70% since 1970, and attributes the loss primarily to agriculture and fishing. The estimate was based on an analysis of 32,000 populations of 5,230 animal species.

== Editions ==
The first version of the Living Planet Report was published on 1998, reporting a 30% decline in the "Living Planet Index (LPI)" from 1970 to 1995, a loss of 5% per year, and included forest, freshwater and marine populations. Between 1990 and 1995, the rate of decline had increased to 6% per year.

The 2000 report indicated a 33% decline in LPI as of 1999.

The 2002 report indicated a 37% decline in LPI as of 2000.

The 2004 report indicated a 40% decline in LPI as of 2000, including additional data from grasslands, savannahs, deserts and tundra, not included in previous reports.

The 2006 report indicated a 33% decline in LPI as of 2003.

The 2008 report indicated a 28% decline in LPI as of 2005.

The 2010 report indicated a 28% decline in LPI as of 2007, due to a 60% decline in the tropics despite a 29% increase in the temperate/polar regions.

The 2012 report indicated a 28% decline in LPI as of 2008, due to a 60% decline in the tropics despite a 31% increase in the temperate/polar regions.

The 2014 report indicated a 52% decline in LPI as of 2010, a significant change from prior publications due to changes in methodology to better reflect the relative sizes of species groups across biomes, and this time showed declines in both tropical (-56%) and temperate (-36%) populations.

The 2016 report indicated a 58% decline in LPI as of 2012 and predicted a decline of 67% by 2020.

The 2018 report indicated a 60% decline in LPI as of 2014.

The 2020 report indicated a 68% decline in LPI as of 2016.

The 2022 report indicated a 69% decline in LPI as of 2018, its most comprehensive assessment to date.

The 2024 report indicated a 73% decline in LPI as of 2020, exceeding the prediction made in the 2016 report. The report is based on almost 35,000 populations of 5,495 species.

== See also ==
- Holocene extinction
