= YouTube moderation =

YouTube, an online video-sharing platform, has faced various criticisms over the years, particularly regarding content moderation, offensive content, and monetization. YouTube has faced criticism over aspects of its operations, its recommendation algorithms perpetuating videos that promote conspiracy theories and falsehoods, hosting videos ostensibly targeting children but containing violent or sexually suggestive content involving popular characters, videos of minors attracting pedophilic activities in their comment sections, and fluctuating policies on the types of content that is eligible to be monetized with advertising. YouTube has faced intensified controversy since Neal Mohan took over as CEO in 2023.

YouTube has also been blocked by several countries. As of 2018, public access to YouTube was blocked by countries including China, North Korea, Iran, Turkmenistan, Uzbekistan, Tajikistan, Eritrea, Sudan and South Sudan.

== History ==
Controversial content has included material relating to Holocaust denial and the Hillsborough disaster, in which 96 football fans from Liverpool were crushed to death in 1989. In July 2008, the Culture and Media Committee of the House of Commons of the United Kingdom stated that it was "unimpressed" with YouTube's system for policing its videos, and argued that "proactive review of content should be standard practice for sites hosting user-generated content". YouTube responded by stating:

We have strict rules on what's allowed, and a system that enables anyone who sees inappropriate content to report it to our 24/7 review team and have it dealt with promptly. We educate our community on the rules and include a direct link from every YouTube page to make this process as easy as possible for our users. Given the volume of content uploaded on our site, we think this is by far the most effective way to make sure that the tiny minority of videos that break the rules come down quickly. (July 2008)

In October 2010, U.S. Congressman Anthony Weiner urged YouTube to remove from its website videos of imam Anwar al-Awlaki. YouTube pulled some of the videos in November 2010, stating they violated the site's guidelines. In December 2010, YouTube added the ability to flag videos for containing terrorism content.

In 2018, YouTube introduced a system that would automatically add information boxes to videos that its algorithms determined may present conspiracy theories and other fake news, filling the infobox with content from Encyclopædia Britannica and Wikipedia as a means to inform users to minimize misinformation propagation without impacting freedom of speech. The Wikimedia Foundation said in a statement that "neither Wikipedia nor the Wikimedia Foundation are part of a formal partnership with YouTube. We were not given advance notice of this announcement."

In the wake of the Notre-Dame fire on April 15, 2019, several user-uploaded videos of the landmark fire were flagged by YouTube' system automatically with an Encyclopædia Britannica article on the false conspiracy theories around the September 11 attacks. Several users complained to YouTube about this inappropriate connection. YouTube officials apologized for this, stating that their algorithms had misidentified the fire videos and added the information block automatically, and were taking steps to remedy this.

To limit the spread of misinformation and fake news via YouTube, it has rolled out a comprehensive policy regarding how it plans to deal with technically manipulated videos.

On April 18, 2023, YouTube revealed its changes in handling content associated with eating disorders. This social media platform's Community Guidelines now prohibit content that could encourage emulation from at-risk users. This content includes behavior that shows severe calorie tracking and purging after eating. However, videos featuring positive behavior such as in the context of recovery will be permitted on the platform under two conditions—the user must have a registered (logged-in) account and must be older than 18. This policy was created in collaboration with nonprofit organizations as well as the National Eating Disorder Association. Garth Graham, YouTube's Global Head of Healthcare revealed in an interview with CNN that this policy change was geared at ensuring that this video-sharing platform provides an avenue for "community recovery and resources" while ensuring continued viewer protection.

In July 2024, YouTube announced it would be taking action against "mass-produced" videos. At the time, AI slop content had become common on YouTube.

On October 9, 2025, YouTube allowed users who were previously suspended to start over, under the condition that the content provides positive impact.

== Moderators ==
YouTube contracts companies to hire content moderators, who view content flagged as potentially violating YouTube's content policies and determines if they should be removed. In September 2020, a class-action suit was filed by a former content moderator who reported developing post-traumatic stress disorder (PTSD) after an 18-month period on the job. The former content moderator said that she was regularly made to exceed YouTube's stated limit of four hours per day of viewing graphic content. The lawsuit alleges that YouTube's contractors gave minimal training, consideration or support for its moderators' mental health, made prospective employees sign NDAs before showing them any examples of content they would see while reviewing, and censored all mention of trauma from its internal forums. It also purports that requests for highly graphic content to be blurred, reduced in size or made monochrome, per recommendations from the National Center for Missing & Exploited Children, were rejected by YouTube as not a high priority for the company.

YouTube has been heavily criticized for excessively using automated bots in its systems for content flagging and appeals. In October 2025, when YouTube's algorithm removed tech tutorial videos its algorithm flagged as "dangerous" or "harmful", creators alleged that there was a lack of human review for appeals, which would reportedly be denied in only a minute; YouTube denied at the time that AI was being used for appeals. After YouTuber Enderman's account was terminated and his appeal was rejected, he among several other YouTubers shared the concerns and alleged a lack of human oversight for the website's content flagging algorithm. Several YouTubers additionally posted evidence supporting the allegations of AI usage, including its reliance on Sprinklr's software.

== Homophobia and transphobia ==
Five leading content creators whose channels were based on LGBTQ+ materials filed a federal lawsuit against YouTube in August 2019, alleging that YouTube's algorithms divert discovery away from their channels, impacting their revenue. The plaintiffs claimed that the algorithms discourage content with words like "lesbian" or "gay", which would be predominant in their channels' content, and because of YouTube's near-monopolization of online video services, they are abusing that position. In early 2021, the lawsuit was dismissed based on the plaintiffs' inability to prove YouTube acted on behalf of the government and because of section 230.

In June 2022, Media Matters, a media watchdog group, reported that homophobic and transphobic content calling LGBT people "predators" and "groomers" was becoming more common on YouTube. The report also referred to common accusations in YouTube videos that LGBT people are mentally ill. The report stated the content appeared to be in violation of YouTube's hate speech policy.

== Animal torture ==
In late 2020, animal welfare charity Lady Freethinker identified 2,053 videos on YouTube in which they stated animals were "deliberately harmed for entertainment or were shown to be under severe psychological distress, physical pain or dead."

In 2021, Lady Freethinker filed a lawsuit accusing YouTube of a breach of contract in allowing a large number of videos on its site showing animal abuse and failing to remove them when notified. YouTube responded by stating that they had "expanded its policy on animal abuse videos" in 2021, and since the introduction of the new policy "removed hundreds of thousands of videos and terminated thousands of channels for violations."

In 2022, Google defeated the Lady Freethinker lawsuit, with a judge ruling that YouTube was protected by Section 230 of the Communications Decency Act, that shields internet platforms from lawsuits based on content posted by their users.

In 2023, YouTube stated that animal abuse "has no place on their platforms, and they are working to remove content (of that nature)".

== Conspiracy theories and far-right content ==
YouTube has been heavily criticized for using an algorithm that gives great prominence to videos that promote conspiracy theories, falsehoods and incendiary fringe discourse. According to an investigation by The Wall Street Journal, "YouTube's recommendations often lead users to channels that feature conspiracy theories, partisan viewpoints and misleading videos, even when those users haven't shown interest in such content. When users show a political bias in what they choose to view, YouTube typically recommends videos that echo those biases, often with more-extreme viewpoints." When users search for political or scientific terms, YouTube's search algorithms often give prominence to hoaxes and conspiracy theories. After YouTube drew controversy for giving top billing to videos promoting falsehoods and conspiracy when people made breaking-news queries during the 2017 Las Vegas shooting, YouTube changed its algorithm to give greater prominence to mainstream media sources. In 2018, it was reported that YouTube was again promoting fringe content about breaking news, giving great prominence to conspiracy videos about Anthony Bourdain's death.

In 2017, it was revealed that advertisements were being placed on extremist videos, including videos by rape apologists, anti-Semites, and hate preachers who received ad payouts. After firms started to stop advertising on YouTube in the wake of this reporting, YouTube apologized and said that it would give firms greater control over where ads got placed.

Alex Jones, known for far-right conspiracy theories, had built a massive audience on YouTube. YouTube drew criticism in 2018 when it removed a video from Media Matters compiling offensive statements made by Jones, stating that it violated its policies on "harassment and bullying". On August 6, 2018, however, YouTube removed Alex Jones' YouTube page following a content violation.

University of North Carolina professor Zeynep Tufekci has referred to YouTube as "The Great Radicalizer", saying "YouTube may be one of the most powerful radicalizing instruments of the 21st century." Jonathan Albright of the Tow Center for Digital Journalism at Columbia University described YouTube as a "conspiracy ecosystem".

In January 2019, YouTube said that it had introduced a new policy starting in the United States intended to stop recommending videos containing "content that could misinform users in harmful ways." YouTube gave flat earth theories, miracle cures, and 9/11 truther-isms as examples. Efforts within YouTube engineering to stop recommending borderline extremist videos falling just short of forbidden hate speech, and track their popularity were originally rejected because they could interfere with viewer engagement.

In January 2019, the site announced it would be implementing measures directed towards "raising authoritative content and reducing borderline content and harmful misinformation." That June, YouTube announced it would be banning Holocaust denial and neo-Nazi content. YouTube has blocked the neo-Nazi propaganda film Europa: The Last Battle from being uploaded.

Multiple research studies have investigated cases of misinformation in YouTube. In a July 2019 study based on ten YouTube searches using the Tor Browser related to climate and climate change, the majority of videos were videos that communicated views contrary to the scientific consensus on climate change. A May 2023 study found that YouTube was monetizing and profiting from videos that included misinformation about climate change. A 2019 BBC investigation of YouTube searches in ten different languages found that YouTube's algorithm promoted health misinformation, including fake cancer cures. In Brazil, YouTube has been linked to pushing pseudoscientific misinformation on health matters, as well as elevated far-right fringe discourse and conspiracy theories. In the Philippines, numerous channels disseminated misinformation related to the 2022 Philippine elections. Additionally, research on the dissemination of Flat Earth beliefs in social media, has shown that networks of YouTube channels form an echo chamber that polarizes audiences by appearing to confirm preexisting beliefs.

=== Use among white supremacists ===
Before 2019, YouTube took steps to remove specific videos or channels related to supremacist content that had violated its acceptable use policies but otherwise did not have site-wide policies against hate speech.

In the wake of the March 2019 Christchurch mosque attacks, YouTube and other sites like Facebook and Twitter that allowed user-submitted content drew criticism for doing little to moderate and control the spread of hate speech, which was considered to be a factor in the rationale for the attacks. These platforms were pressured to remove such content, but in an interview with The New York Times, YouTube's chief product officer Neal Mohan said that unlike content such as ISIS videos which take a particular format and thus easy to detect through computer-aided algorithms, general hate speech was more difficult to recognize and handle, and thus could not readily take action to remove without human interaction.

In May 2019, YouTube joined an initiative led by France and New Zealand with other countries and tech companies to develop tools to be used to block online hate speech and to develop regulations, to be implemented at the national level, to be levied against technology firms that failed to take steps to remove such speech, though the United States declined to participate. Subsequently, on June 5, 2019, YouTube announced a major change to its terms of service, "specifically prohibiting videos alleging that a group is superior in order to justify discrimination, segregation or exclusion based on qualities like age, gender, race, caste, religion, sexual orientation or veteran status." YouTube identified specific examples of such videos as those that "promote or glorify Nazi ideology, which is inherently discriminatory". YouTube further stated it would "remove content denying that well-documented violent events, like the Holocaust or the shooting at Sandy Hook Elementary, took place."

In August 2019, the channel of the white nationalist website VDARE was banned. The ban was later reversed. The channel was permanently banned in August 2020 for violating YouTube's policies against hate speech.

In September 2018, YouTube limited some videos by Red Ice, a white supremacist multimedia company, after it posted a video claiming that white women were being "pushed" into interracial relationships. In October 2019, YouTube banned Red Ice's main channel for hate speech violations. The channel had about 330,000 subscribers. Lana Lokteff and Red Ice promoted a backup channel in an attempt to circumvent the ban. A week later, the backup channel was also removed by YouTube.

In June 2020, YouTube was criticized for allowing white supremacist content on its platform for years after it announced it would be pledging $1 million to fight racial injustice. Later that month, it banned several channels associated with white supremacy, including those of Stefan Molyneux, David Duke, and Richard B. Spencer, asserting these channels violated their policies on hate speech. The ban occurred the same day that Reddit announced the ban on several hate speech sub-forums including r/The Donald.

== Handling of COVID-19 pandemic and other misinformation ==
Following the dissemination via YouTube of misinformation related to the COVID-19 pandemic that 5G communications technology was responsible for the spread of coronavirus disease 2019 which led to multiple 5G towers in the United Kingdom being attacked by arsonists, YouTube removed all such videos linking 5G and the coronavirus in this manner.

In September 2021, YouTube extended this policy to cover videos disseminating misinformation related to any vaccine, including those long approved against measles or Hepatitis B, that had received approval from local health authorities or the World Health Organization. The platform proceeded to remove the accounts of anti-vaccine campaigners such as Robert F. Kennedy Jr. and Joseph Mercola.

Google and YouTube implemented policies in October 2021 to deny monetization or revenue to advertisers or content creators that promoted climate change denial, which "includes content referring to climate change as a hoax or a scam, claims denying that long-term trends show the global climate is warming, and claims denying that greenhouse gas emissions or human activity contribute to climate change." In January 2024, the Center for Countering Digital Hate reported that climate change deniers were instead pushing other forms of climate change denial that have not yet been banned by YouTube, including false claims that global warming is "beneficial or harmless", and which undermined climate solutions and climate science.

In July 2022, YouTube announced policies to combat misinformation surrounding abortion, such as videos with instructions to perform abortion methods that are considered unsafe and videos that contain misinformation about the safety of abortion.

=== Election misinformation ===
YouTube has extended the moderation of misinformation to non-medical areas. In the weeks following the 2020 United States presidential election, the site added policies to remove or label videos promoting election fraud claims; however, it reversed this policy in June 2023, citing that the reversal was necessary to "openly debate political ideas, even those that are controversial or based on disproven assumptions".

In the wake of the 2024 United States presidential election, YouTube reported that it had been working to remove content that promoted election interference, misled voters, or encouraged political violence. The platform also vowed to remove election misinformation generated by artificial intelligence.

=== Child safety and wellbeing ===
Leading into 2017, there was a significant increase in the number of videos related to children, coupled between the popularity of parents vlogging their family's activities, and previous content creators moving away from content that often was criticized or demonetized into family-friendly material. In 2017, YouTube reported that time watching family vloggers had increased by 90%. However, with the increase in videos featuring children, the site began to face several controversies related to child safety. During Q2 2017, the owners of popular channel FamilyOFive, which featured themselves playing "pranks" on their children, were accused of child abuse. Their videos were eventually deleted, and two of their children were removed from their custody. A similar case happened in 2019 when the owner of the channel Fantastic Adventures was accused of abusing her adopted children. Her videos would later be deleted.

Later that year, YouTube came under criticism for showing inappropriate videos targeted at children and often featuring popular characters in violent, sexual or otherwise disturbing situations, many of which appeared on YouTube Kids and attracted millions of views. The term "Elsagate" was coined on the Internet and then used by various news outlets to refer to this controversy. On November 11, 2017, YouTube announced it was strengthening site security to protect children from unsuitable content. Later that month, the company started to mass delete videos and channels that made improper use of family-friendly characters. As part of a broader concern regarding child safety on YouTube, the wave of deletions also targeted channels that showed children taking part in inappropriate or dangerous activities under the guidance of adults. Most notably, the company removed Toy Freaks, a channel with over 8.5 million subscribers, that featured a father and his two daughters in odd and upsetting situations. According to analytics specialist SocialBlade, it earned up to $11.2 million annually prior to its deletion in November 2017.

Even for content that appears to be aimed at children and appears to contain only child-friendly content, YouTube's system allows for anonymity of who uploads these videos. These questions have been raised in the past, as YouTube has had to remove channels with children's content which, after becoming popular, then suddenly include inappropriate content masked as children's content. Alternative, some of the most-watched children's programming on YouTube comes from channels that have no identifiable owners, raising concerns of intent and purpose. One channel that had been of concern was "Cocomelon" which provided numerous mass-produced animated videos aimed at children. Up through 2019, it had drawn up to US$10 million a month in ad revenue and was one of the largest kid-friendly channels on YouTube before 2020. Ownership of Cocomelon was unclear outside of its ties to "Treasure Studio", itself an unknown entity, raising questions as to the channel's purpose, but Bloomberg News had been able to confirm and interview the small team of American owners in February 2020 regarding "Cocomelon", who stated their goal for the channel was to simply entertain children, wanting to keep to themselves to avoid attention from outside investors. The anonymity of such channel raise concerns because of the lack of knowledge of what purpose they are trying to serve. The difficulty to identify who operates these channels "adds to the lack of accountability", according to Josh Golin of the Campaign for a Commercial-Free Childhood, and educational consultant Renée Chernow-O'Leary found the videos were designed to entertain with no intent to educate, all leading to critics and parents to be concerned for their children becoming too enraptured by the content from these channels. Content creators that earnestly make child-friendly videos have found it difficult to compete with larger channels, unable to produce content at the same rate as them, and lacking the same means of being promoted through YouTube's recommendation algorithms that the larger animated channel networks have shared.

In January 2019, YouTube officially banned videos containing "challenges that encourage acts that have an inherent risk of severe physical harm" (such as the Tide Pod Challenge) and videos featuring pranks that "make victims believe they're in physical danger" or cause emotional distress in children.

== Sexualization of children and pedophilia ==
In November 2017, it was revealed in the media that many videos featuring children—often uploaded by the minors themselves, and showing innocent or seemingly appropriate content such as the children playing with toys or performing gymnastics—were attracting comments from pedophiles with sexual predators finding the videos through private YouTube playlists or typing in certain keywords in Russian. Other child-centric videos originally uploaded to YouTube began propagating on the dark web, and uploaded or embedded onto forums known to be used by pedophiles.

As a result of the controversy, which added to the concern about the phenomenon known as "Elsagate", several major advertisers whose ads had been running against such videos froze spending on YouTube. In December 2018, The Times found more than 100 grooming cases in which children were manipulated into sexually implicit behavior (such as taking off clothes, adopting overtly sexual poses and touching other children inappropriately) by strangers. After a reporter flagged the videos in question, half of them were removed, and the rest were removed after The Times contacted YouTube's PR department.

In February 2019, YouTube vlogger Matt Watson identified a "wormhole" that would cause the YouTube recommendation algorithm to draw users into this type of video content, and make all of that user's recommended content feature only these types of videos. Most of these videos had comments from sexual predators commenting with timestamps of when the children were shown in compromising positions or otherwise making indecent remarks. In some cases, other users had re-uploaded the video in unlisted form but with incoming links from other videos, and then monetized these, propagating this network. In the wake of the controversy, the service reported that they had deleted over 400 channels and tens of millions of comments, and reported the offending users to law enforcement and the National Center for Missing and Exploited Children. A spokesperson explained that "any content—including comments—that endangers minors is abhorrent and we have clear policies prohibiting this on YouTube. There's more to be done, and we continue to work to improve and catch abuse more quickly." Despite these measures, AT&T, Disney, Dr. Oetker, Epic Games, and Nestlé all pulled their advertising from YouTube.

Subsequently, YouTube began to demonetize and block advertising on the types of videos that have drawn these predatory comments. The service explained that this was a temporary measure while they explore other methods to eliminate the problem. YouTube also began to flag channels that predominantly feature children, and preemptively disable their comments sections. "Trusted partners" can request that comments be re-enabled, but the channel will then become responsible for moderating comments. These actions primarily target videos of toddlers, but videos of older children and teenagers may be protected as well if they contain actions that can be interpreted as sexual, such as gymnastics. YouTube stated it was also working on a better system to remove comments on other channels that matched the style of child predators.

A related attempt to algorithmically flag videos containing references to the string "CP" (an abbreviation of child pornography) resulted in some prominent false positives involving unrelated topics using the same abbreviation, including videos related to the mobile video game Pokémon Go (which uses "CP" as an abbreviation of the statistic "Combat Power"), and Club Penguin. YouTube apologized for the errors and reinstated the affected videos. Separately, online trolls have attempted to have videos flagged for takedown or removal by commenting with statements similar to what the child predators had said; this activity became an issue during the PewDiePie–T-Series rivalry in early 2019. YouTube stated they do not take action on any video with these comments but those that they have flagged that are likely to draw child predator activity.

In June 2019, The New York Times cited researchers who found that users who watched erotic videos could be recommended seemingly innocuous videos of children. As a result, Senator Josh Hawley stated plans to introduce federal legislation that would ban YouTube and other video sharing sites from including videos that predominantly feature minors as "recommended" videos, excluding those that were "professionally produced", such as videos of televised talent shows. YouTube has suggested potential plans to remove all videos featuring children from the main YouTube site and transferring them to the YouTube Kids site where they would have stronger controls over the recommendation system, as well as other major changes on the main YouTube site to the recommended feature and auto-play system.

== Misogyny ==
An August 2022 report by the Center for Countering Digital Hate, a British think tank, found that harassment against women was flourishing on YouTube. It noted that channels espousing a similar ideology to that of men's rights influencer Andrew Tate were using YouTube to grow their audience, despite Tate being banned from the platform. In his 2022 book Like, Comment, Subscribe: Inside YouTube's Chaotic Rise to World Domination, Bloomberg reporter Mark Bergen said that many female content creators were dealing with harassment, bullying, and stalking.

In September 2025, 404 Media reported that a YouTube channel featuring AI-generated videos of women being shot in the head had accumulated over 175,000 views since June. The videos had been generated using Google's Veo. YouTube removed the channel for violating its terms of service following a request for comment from 404 Media.
