= Clickbot.A =

Computer botnet

Clickbot.A is a botnet that is used for click fraud.

The bot was first discovered by Swa Frantzen at SANS' Internet Storm Center in May 2006. At that time, the botnet had infected about 100 machines. The infected population grew to over 100,000 machines within one month.

The bot was written as a plugin to Internet Explorer that was downloaded by IE users. It operated by using victims' computers to automatically click on pay-per-click Internet advertisements.

It is also used to steal passwords from unsuspecting users.

== See also ==
- Browser Helper Object
- Botnet
- Click farm
- Click fraud
- Download.ject
- Trojan horse (computing)
- ZeroAccess botnet
- Zombie (computer science)
