= Adcash =

Company based in Estonia

Adcash OÜ
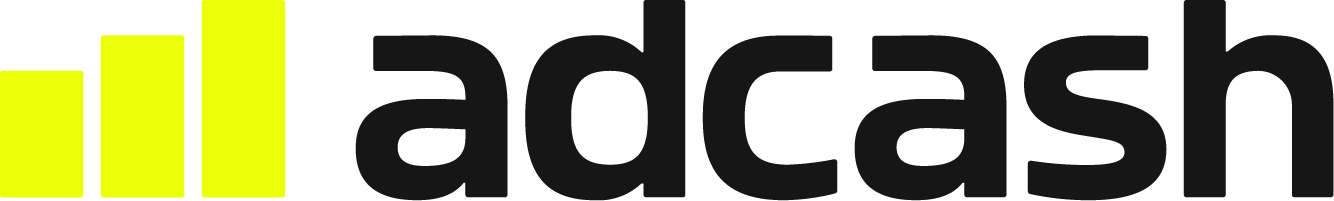
- Trade name: Adcash
- Type: Privately held company
- Industry: Advertisement; Information technology Internet
- Founded: Tallinn, Estonia (2007)
- Founder: Thomas Padovani; Christophe Avignon
- Headquarters: Tallinn, Estonia
- Area served: Worldwide
- Products: Online advertising Affiliate marketing Mobile advertising Display advertising
- Revenue: ▲€25 million (2021)
- Website: www.adcash.com

Adcash is a worldwide online advertising platform for advertisers and publishers based in Tallinn, Estonia.

== History ==
Adcash was founded in 2007 by Christophe Avignon and Thomas Padovani. Avignon and Padovani, who are originally from France, came to Estonia to establish the new company. The company was started with no direct funding, with the first sales agreements obtained through direct sales.

The Adcash Advertising Network was spun off as a separate company, Adcash OÜ, in 2011. It remained a subsidiary of Webinfluence Group AS from 2011 until 2022, after that, majority stake was acquired.

In 2012, the company's turnover was €11,7 million followed by growth in 2013 seeing revenues at almost €25 million.

In 2024, the company's turnover was 33 million euros - net loss 2.6 million euros, in 2025, turnover was 27.2 million - net loss almost 3.4 million euros.

== Services ==
Adcash is global ad platform that provides advertisers, media buyers, affiliates and ad networks digital advertising tools that help them reach global audiences. For publishers, they offer sourcing and placing high-quality ads to monetize their website.

There are several ad formats available in the platform like pop-under ads, interstitial ads, in-page-push ads, banner ads, and video ads. Verticals Adcash mainly operates in are entertainment, sports, VOD, iGaming, Dating, VPN, Software, Finance, Sweepstakes and eCommerce.

== Anti-fraud mission ==
Adcash fights to protect its platform and clients against digital ad fraud. Adcash uses its in-house anti-fraud technology to eliminate fraud and save advertisers’ budgets. In 2025 Their anti-fraud technology saved advertisers a combined $32.8 Million USD in campaign budgets.

== Recognition ==
In 2015, Adcash was awarded two titles at the EAS gala dinner of Estonia's best companies. The first title was for the Innovator of the Year, and the second for the most competitive medium-sized enterprise in Estonia.

At the 2016 Kuldmuna competition, the company received the Oskari Muna award (4th place) in the Event Marketing/Internal Communication Event category. The Estonian Chamber of Commerce and Industry selected the company as Estonia's most competitive small and medium-sized enterprise of 2016.

In 2017, the company won an award in the Kuldmuna Event Marketing/Internal Event category. The company ranked 441st in the Financial Times list of Europe's 1,000 fastest-growing companies.

In 2018, the company received the third prize, the Bronze Egg (Pronksmuna), in the Kuldmuna Event Marketing/Internal Communication Event category.

In March 2020, the company received the Bronze Egg (Pronksmuna) award at the Kuldmuna competition in the Event Marketing/Internal Communication Event category.

In 2025, Adcash won 2nd place in the Best Native Ad Networks category at the uCompares Awards 2025.

In 2026, Adcash was awarded with a Community Builder title at the World AdTech Day Awards.

== Sponsorship ==
Adcash supported the Pegasus Racing team in the 24 Hours of Le Mans endurance race in 2014.

Company has exhibited in and sponsored many conferences in adtech and affiliate industry. For 2026 i-Con Island Conference in Cyprus, Adcash was Shuttle Buses Sponsor and 3on3 Basketball Court Sponsor.
