= Botlab =

Online security organization

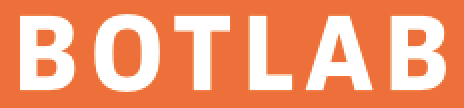
- Formation: March 30, 2015; 11 years ago
- Founded at: Helsinki, Boston
- Type: 501(c)(3) nonprofit organization
- Purpose: research and development related to ad fraud, user rights violations and other malicious practices in the advertising technology supply-chain.
- Key people: Mikko Kotila, Amit Phansalkar
- Website: www.botlab.io

Botlab (previously known as botlab.io) is a non-profit, volunteer based research foundation focused on research, publication and open-source development related with ad fraud, malvertising, privacy violations and other malicious practices in the advertising supported internet. Botlab's global volunteer network works towards the goal of more transparent and more secure internet.

== Media Coverage ==
A paper authored by Botlab, Compendium of Ad Fraud Knowledge has been widely covered in the media including a Financial Times cover story. The paper is a collaboration with World Federation of Advertisers (WFA), whose members collectively represent 90% of the world's US$700 advertising budgets. WFA published the paper as an official guideline document to its members for understanding and countering ad fraud.

Botlab researchers were featured in two additional Financial Times cover stories during 2015 and 2016 one of which was Big Read , a major editorial piece of the week in Financial Times print. In addition Botlab's work and commentary have been widely featured in ad industry press, events and social media.

== Research ==
During 2016 Botlab's Ad Fraud Council was the author of World Federation of Advertisers guidance on ad fraud to its members titled Compendium of Ad Fraud Knowledge. Botlab also contributed as co-author to Independent auditing of online display advertising campaigns, a research paper accepted to Hotnets academic conference in 2016 and was a major contributor in Entropy Method for Detecting Invalid Traffic at Scale, a paper introducing an open source method for large scale detection of invalid traffic.

== Open Source Contributions ==
During 2015 and 2016 Botlab made available three open source solutions focused on detection and prevention of advertising fraud:

- Denylist - a blacklist consisting of over 130 million data center IP addresses
- Sitemind - a site research tool for researchers and media planners to counter ad fraud
- Nameles - an entropy based detection and filtering solution to counter ad fraud

== Collaboration with Trade associations ==
In addition to being listed as one of the partners by World Federation of Advertisers, since Botlab's founding in early 2015 its Principal Mikko Kotila acted as the co-chair for I-COM's Data science Board, I-COM is a global trade body backed by 100 associations in 40 countries, today, exploring the creation of business value from Marketing Data & Measurement.
