= TOI-5624 b =

Hot sub-neptune orbiting TOI-5624

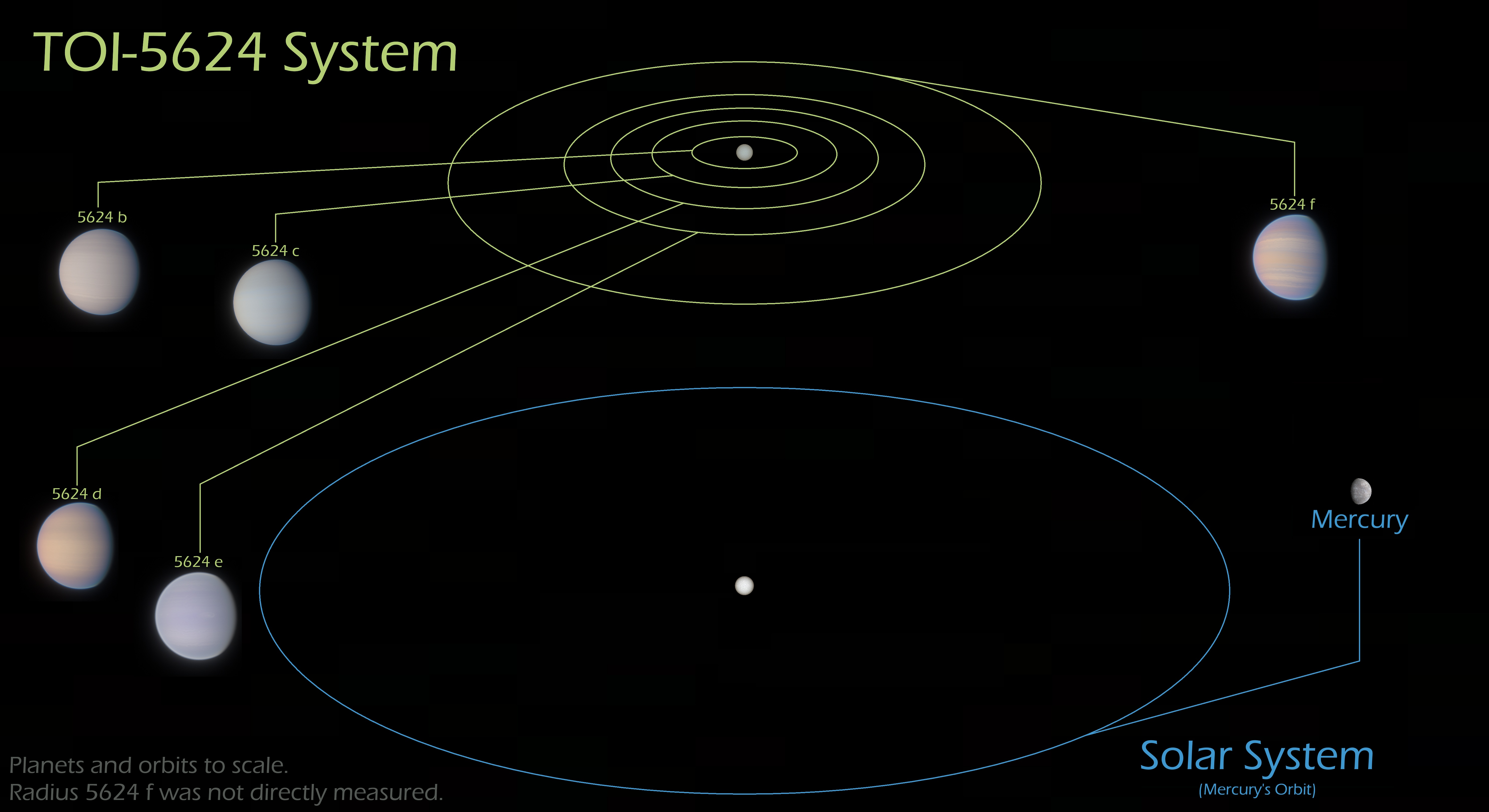
- Artistic depiction of the TOI-5624 system (sizes to scale) compared to Mercury's orbit. TOI-5624 b is the innermost planet with in the system, designated as 5624 b.

Discovery
- Discovered by: Andrea Bonfant et al.
- Discovery site: Transiting Exoplanet Survey Satellite
- Discovery date: April 22, 2026
- Detection method: Transit

Orbital characteristics
- Semi-major axis: 0.04201+0.00041 −0.00043 AU
- Eccentricity: 0 (fixed)
- Orbital period (sidereal): 3.3903473±0.0000054 d
- Inclination: 89.41+0.41 −0.51
- Argument of perihelion: 90 (fixed)
- Semi-amplitude: 4.46±0.65 m/s
- Star: TOI-5624

Physical characteristics
- Mean radius: 2.314±0.035 R_{🜨}
- Mass: 9.4±1.4 M_{🜨}
- Mean density: 4.00+0.60 −0.59 g/cm^{3}
- Temperature: 1,136 ± 15 K (862.9 ± 15.0 °C; 1,585.1 ± 27.0 °F)

TOI-5624 b is the innermost and smallest exoplanet discovered in the TOI-5624 system, located approximately 331 light-years from Earth in the constellation Ursa Major. The planet was confirmed in late April 2026 using the transit method.

== Characteristics ==
=== Physical characteristics ===
Size comparison
Neptune	TOI-5624 b
Neptune	Exoplanet

The object is classified as a dense hot sub-Neptune, with a mass of 9.4±1.4 M_{🜨} and a radius of 2.314±0.035 R_{🜨}. These parameters were determined using the radial velocity method and the European CHEOPS telescope. Its average density, equal to 4.00+0.60
−0.59 g/cm^{3}, indicates the presence of a significant solid core surrounded by a less massive gaseous envelope.

=== Orbit ===
The planet is the closest to its host star, and therefore its orbital period is 3.3903473±0.0000054 Earth days, at a distance of 0.04201+0.00041
−0.00043 AU. Due to its proximity to the star, the equilibrium temperature reaches 1136 K or 863 °C.

== See also ==
- List of exoplanets discovered in 2026
- Methods of detecting exoplanets
