= TOI-5624 f =

Neptune-like exoplanet orbiting TOI-5624

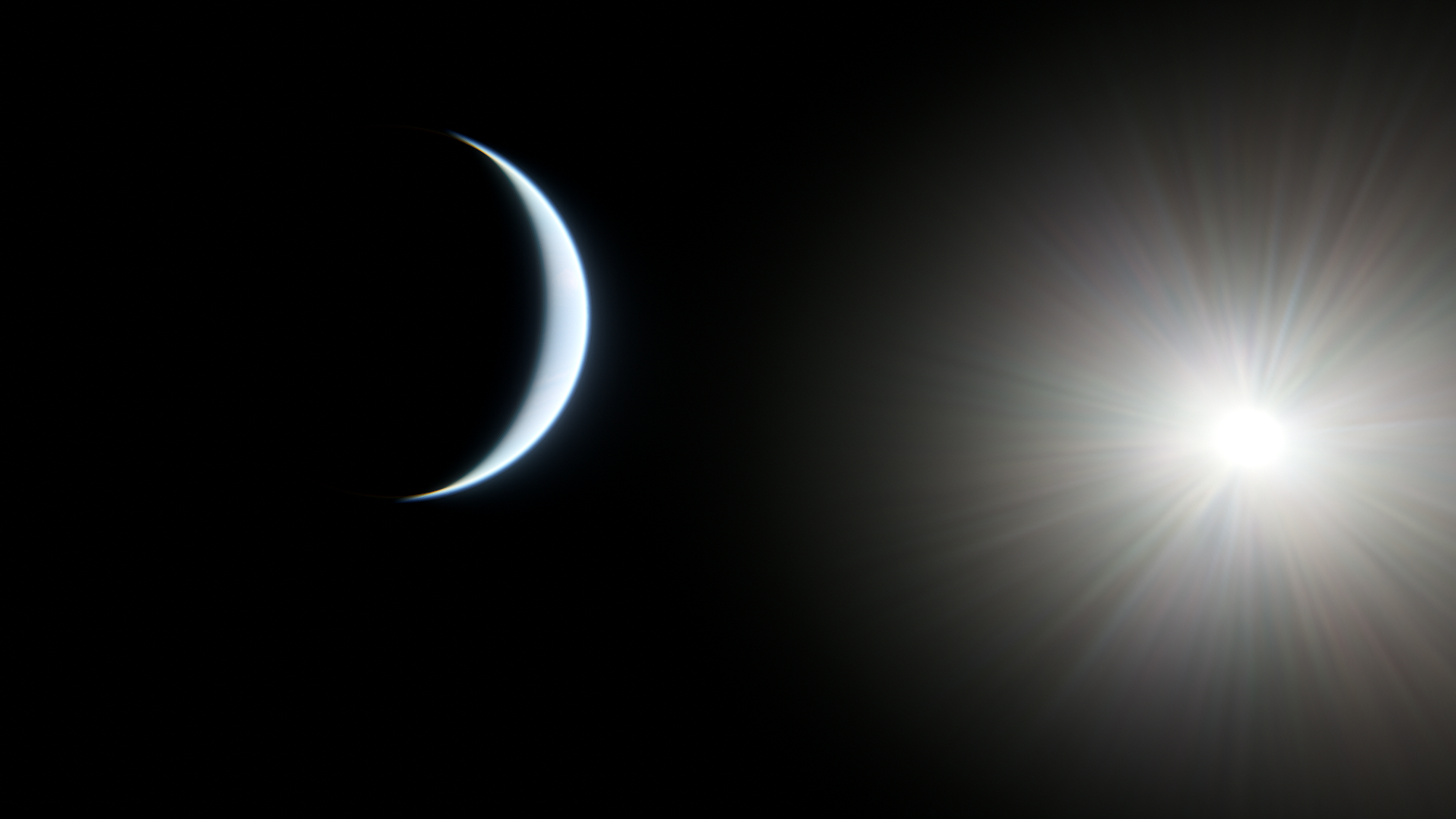
- Artistic depiction of the exoplanet TOI-5624 f, the outermost planet in the TOI-5624 system

Discovery
- Discovered by: Andrea Bonfant et al.
- Discovery site: Transiting Exoplanet Survey Satellite
- Discovery date: April 22, 2026
- Detection method: Transit-timing variation + Radial velocity

Orbital characteristics
- Semi-major axis: 0.2366+0.0040 −0.0041 AU
- Eccentricity: 0 (fixed)
- Orbital period (sidereal): 45.37+0.74 −0.90 d
- Argument of perihelion: 90 (fixed)
- Semi-amplitude: 2.59±0.73 m/s
- Star: TOI-5624

Physical characteristics
- Mass: 13.0±3.7 M_{🜨}
- Temperature: 478.5+7.1 −7.0 K (205.35 °C; 401.63 °F)

TOI-5624 f is the fifth and outermost exoplanet discovered in the TOI-5624 system, located approximately 331 light-years from Earth in the constellation Ursa Major. The discovery of the object was officially announced by an international team of astronomers led by Andrea Bonfant in late April 2026.

The exoplanet's discovery stemmed from analyzing transit timing variations (TTVs) of the fourth planet in the system, TOI-5624 e. Gravitational perturbations affecting this planet pointed to an unseen outer companion, and the exoplanet was subsequently confirmed using radial velocity measurements from the HARPS-N and SOPHIE spectrographs.

== Characteristics ==
=== Physical characteristics ===
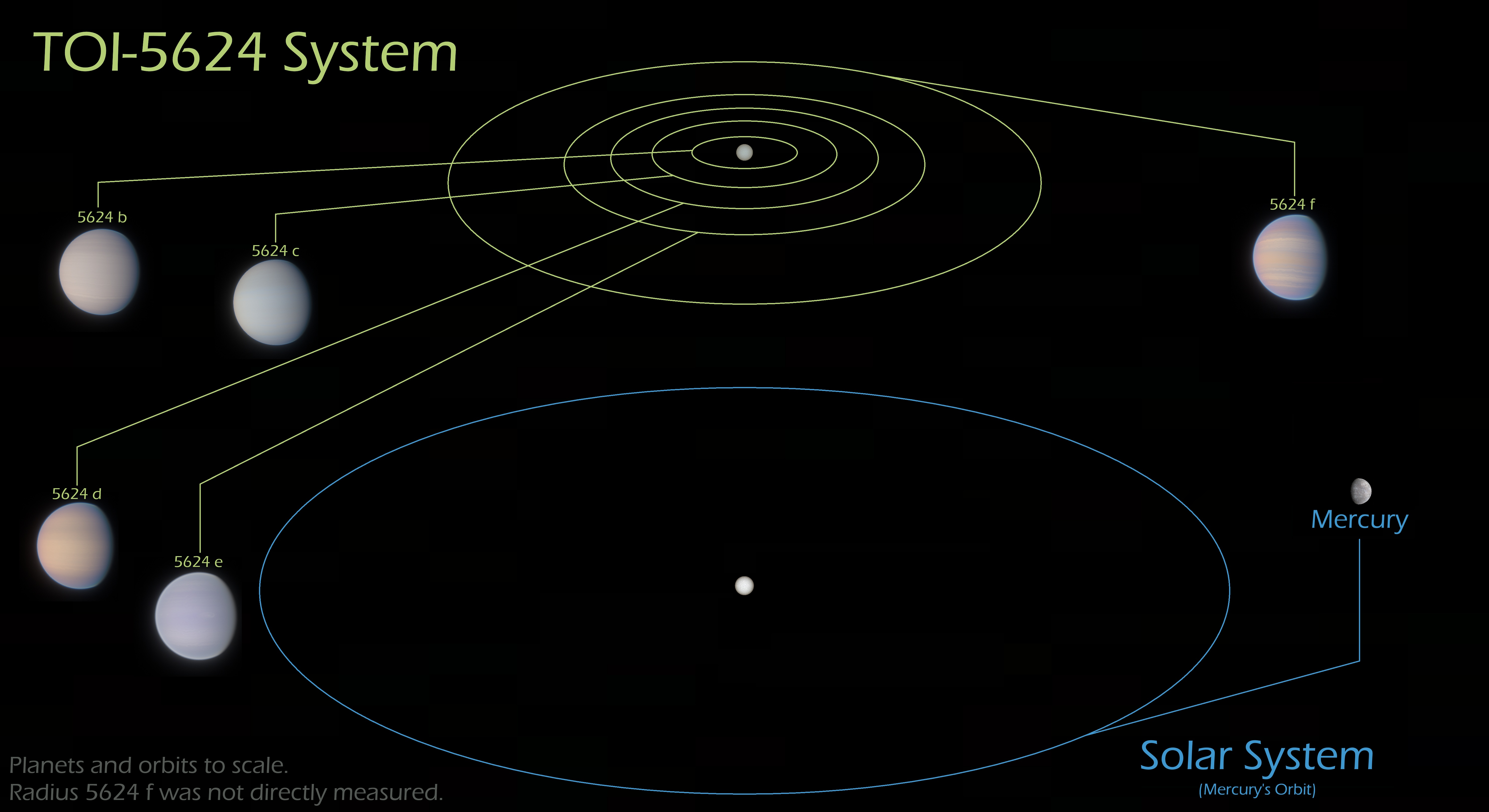
Artistic depiction of the TOI-5624 system (sizes to scale) compared to Mercury's orbit. TOI-5624 f is the outermost planet in the system, designated as 5624 f

The object is classified as a warm Neptune. Since the planet is not transiting, its radius has not been directly measured. The minimum mass, determined by the radial velocity method, is 13.0±3.7 M_{🜨}. According to numerical modeling of the system's dynamical stability, the planet's true mass cannot exceed 26 M_{🜨}, otherwise the system would become unstable over cosmological timescales. It is hypothesized that the planet possesses a massive hydrogen and helium atmosphere or contains a significant fraction of water ice.

The planet receives significantly less energy from its star than the inner planets of the system. Its equilibrium temperature is estimated at 478.5 K, which is about 205 °C, assuming an albedo similar to Neptune's Bond albedo.

=== Orbit ===
As the planet is the outermost of the four other known planets in the system, its orbital period is the longest, at 45.43 days. Its orbit lies at a distance of 0.2366 AU from its host star, which is approximately 60% of Mercury's distance from the Sun. Based on the dynamic stability modeling of the system, the orbital inclination of the exoplanet f will be in the range of 60 to 90 degrees. The planet itself is in strong dynamical interaction with the planet TOI-5624 e. Their orbital periods are in a 2:1 ratio, leading to significant transit timing variations (TTVs) for the inner planet.

In terms of its physical parameters, TOI-5624 f is most similar to Uranus; however, due to its proximity to the star, it is significantly hotter than the ice giants of the Solar System.

== See also ==
- List of exoplanets discovered in 2026
- Transit-timing variation
- TOI-5624 e
