= TOI-5624 =

Sun-like star in the constellation Ursa Major

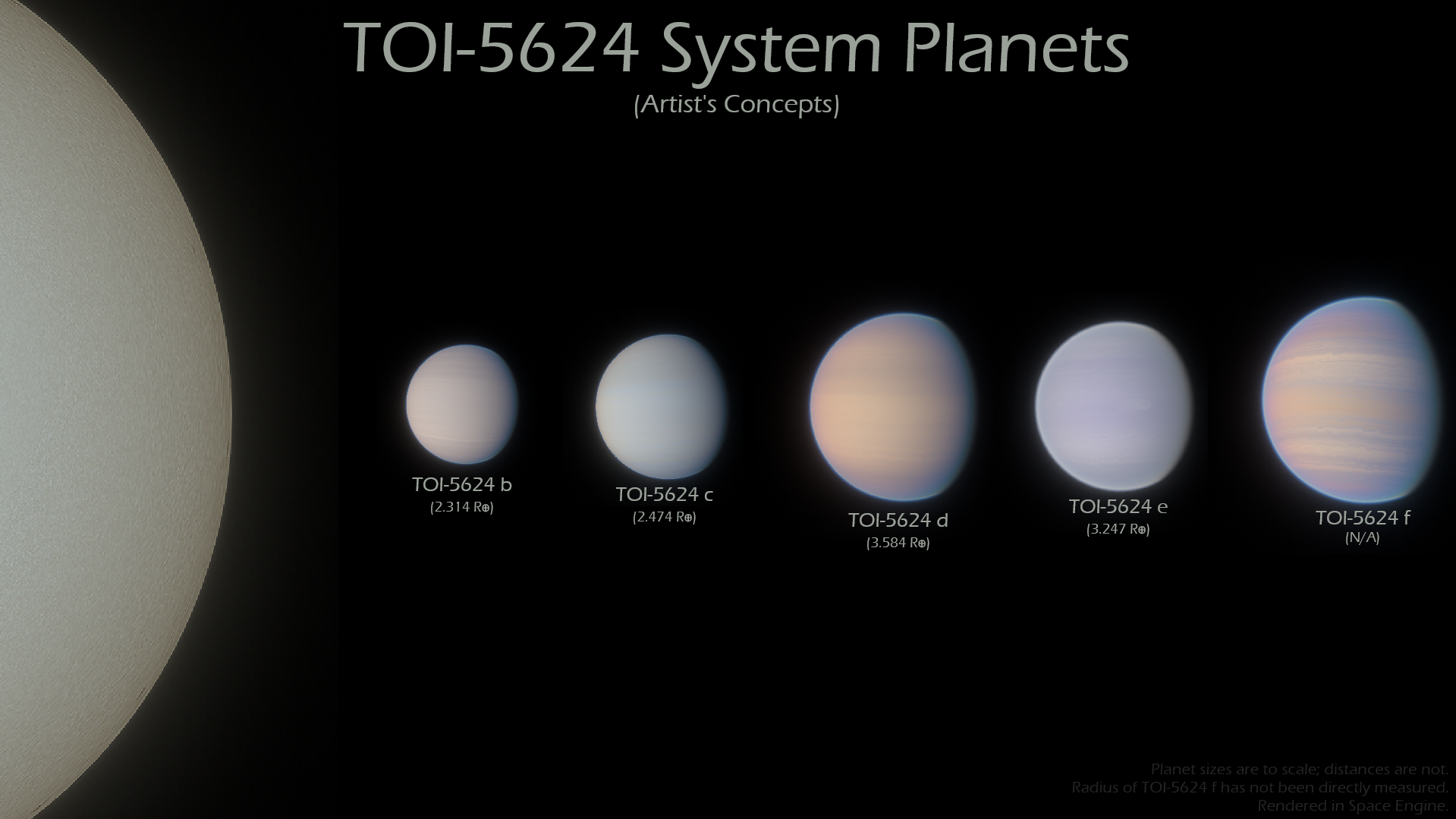
- Artistic rendering of the exoplanet system TOI-5624 (not to scale)

Observation data Epoch J2000 Equinox ICRS
- Constellation: Ursa Major
- Right ascension: 12^{h} 03^{m} 22.765^{s}
- Declination: +49° 15′ 04.39″
- Apparent magnitude (V): 10.81

Characteristics
- Evolutionary stage: Main sequence
- Spectral type: G7 V

Astrometry
Radial velocity (R_{v})	−30.74 km/s
Proper motion (μ)	RA: −76.620 mas/yr Dec.: +1.246 mas/yr
Parallax (π)	9.8638±0.0155 mas
Distance	330.7 ± 0.5 ly (101.4 ± 0.2 pc)

Details
Mass	0.858+0.033 −0.029 M_{☉}
Radius	0.820±0.005 R_{☉}
Luminosity	0.486±0.024 L_{☉}
Surface gravity (log g)	4.49±0.03 cgs
Temperature	5,327±64 K
Metallicity [Fe/H]	−0.023±0.040 dex
Rotational velocity (v sin i)	2.0±0.5 km/s
Age	5.7+2.6 −2.3 Gyr

Other designations
- BD+50 1888, TOI-5624, TIC 53498154, Gaia DR3 1546352569189373952

Database references
SIMBAD	data

TOI-5624 (also known as TIC 53498154) is a Sun-like star located in the zodiacal constellation Ursa Major, approximately 331 light-years away from Earth. Four sub-Neptunes, identified via transit photometry, are in orbit around the star, accompanied by an outer companion detected through transit timing variations.

The star itself is a late yellow dwarf with a spectral type of G7V, a mass of 0.858 solar masses, a radius of 0.820 solar radii, and a temperature of 5327 K. With this data, the star's luminosity was determined to be 0.486 solar luminosities. The star's metallicity is only 0.023 dex, and its age is estimated to be 5.7 billion years. The star rotates on its axis at a speed of 2 km/s.

== Planetary system ==
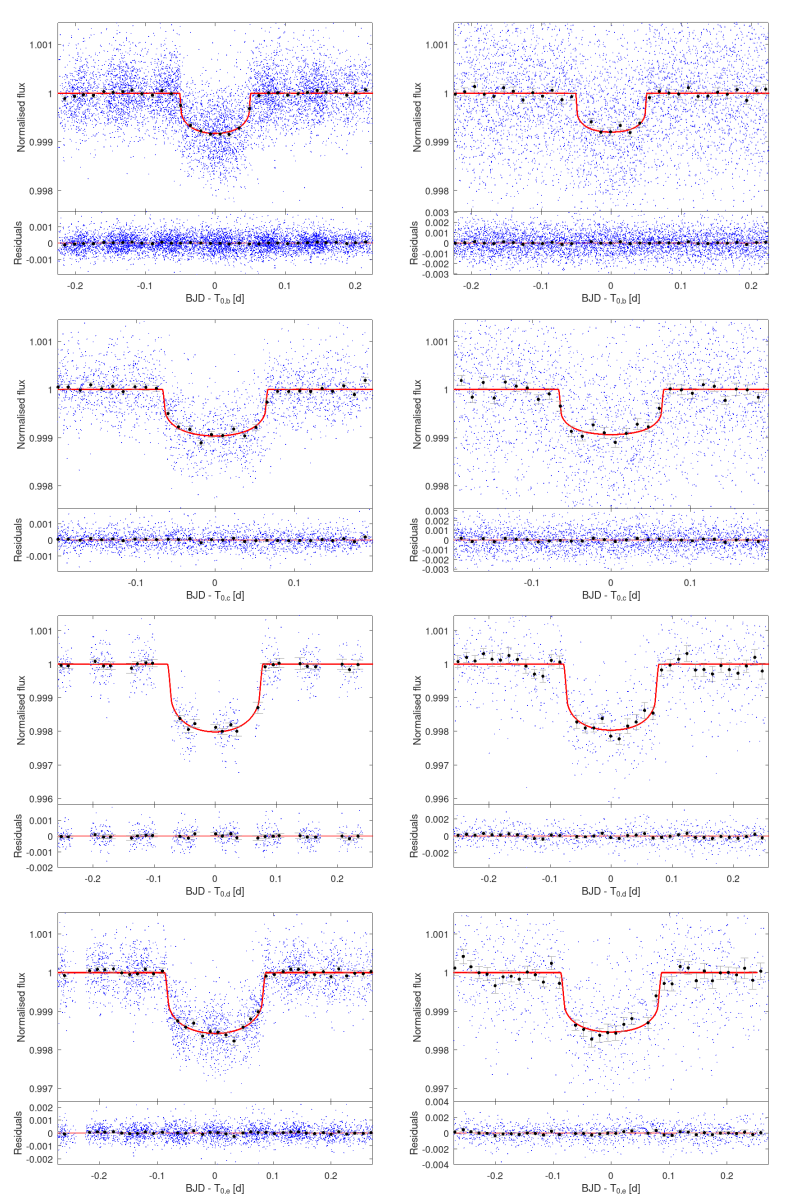
Folded and detrendend LCs of planets b to e (top to bottom) as observed by CHEOPS (left) and TESS (right).

In July 2019, the TESS space telescope, during its monitoring of Sector 14, detected periodic transit signals from the star TIC 53498154. The object was assigned the status "TESS Objects of Interest" and designated as TOI-5624. At that time, the first two planet candidates were identified: TOI-5624 b and TOI-5624 c. After processing data from additional sectors 40 and 41 and applying specialized algorithms for detecting faint signals, two more transit candidates with longer orbital periods were discovered: TOI-5624 d and TOI-5624 e. Thus, the number of transiting planet candidates in the system increased to four.

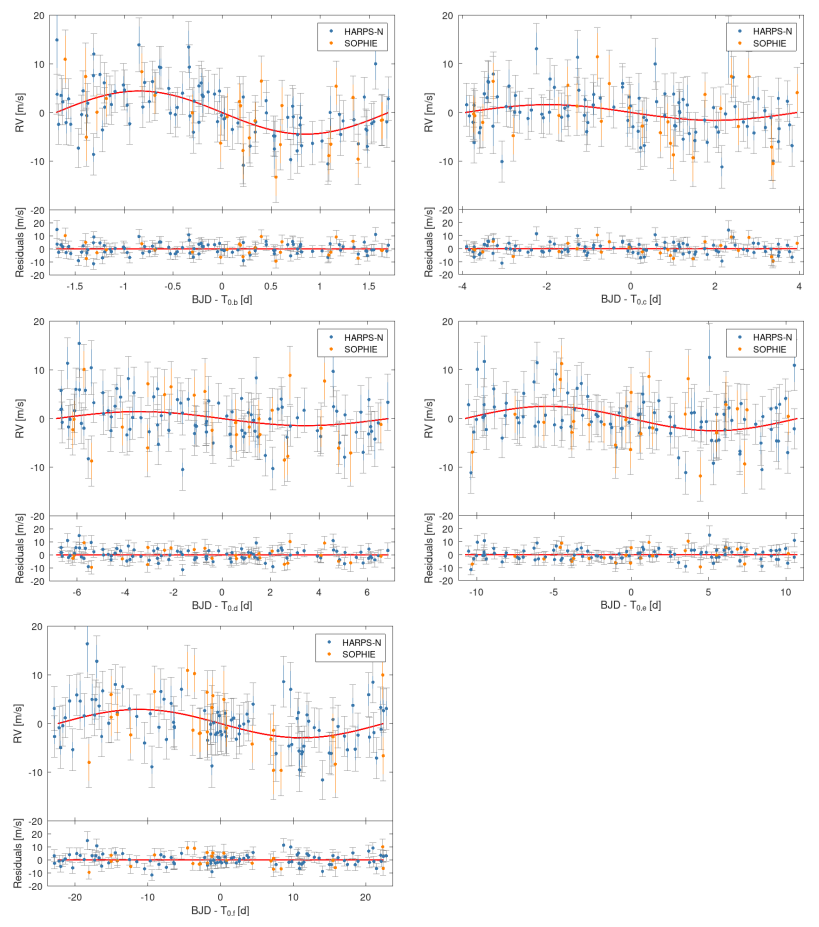
Detrended RV time series folded according to the period of TOI-5624 b (top-left), TOI-5624 c (top-right), TOI-5624 d (middleleft), TOI-5624 e (middle-right), and TOI-5624 f (bottom-left) after removing the Keplerian signals of the other planets as inferred from the MCMCI analysis.

Between 2021 and 2024, a multi-year campaign to measure the star's radial velocities began to determine the planets' masses. The main observations were conducted using the SOPHIE and HARPS-N spectrographs. By 2024, over 120 high-precision measurements had been accumulated, which allowed for the confirmation of the planets' existence and the determination of their masses with high accuracy.

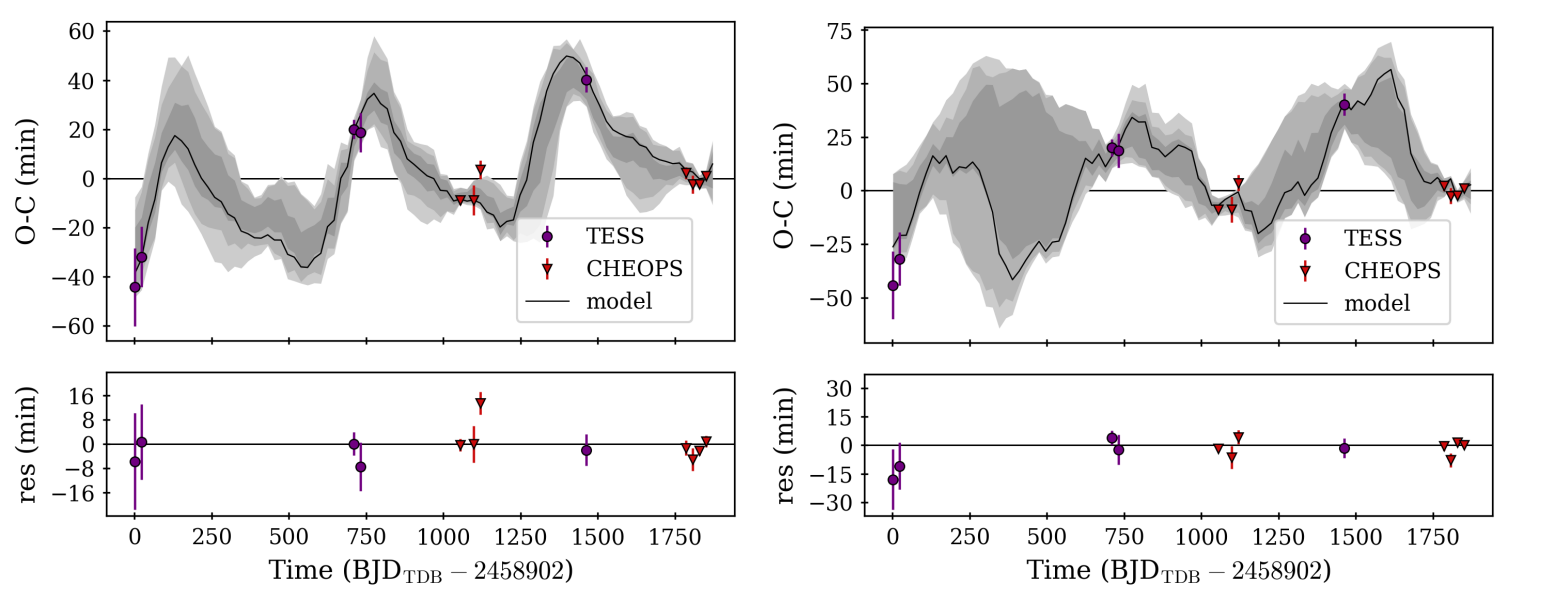
O−C diagrams of TOI-5624 e for two additional dynamical analyses to test the robustness of the five-planet solution.

In 2024, the European CHEOPS telescope conducted a series of targeted observations to refine the planets' sizes. As a result, these targeted observations allowed for the refinement of the planets' radii with an uncertainty of less than 1.7%, enabling a detailed calculation of their densities and their classification as sub-Neptunes. At the end of 2024, using Transit Timing Variation (TTV) analysis, it was discovered that planet e was undergoing gravitational perturbations, indicating the presence of an external companion not transiting the star's disk.

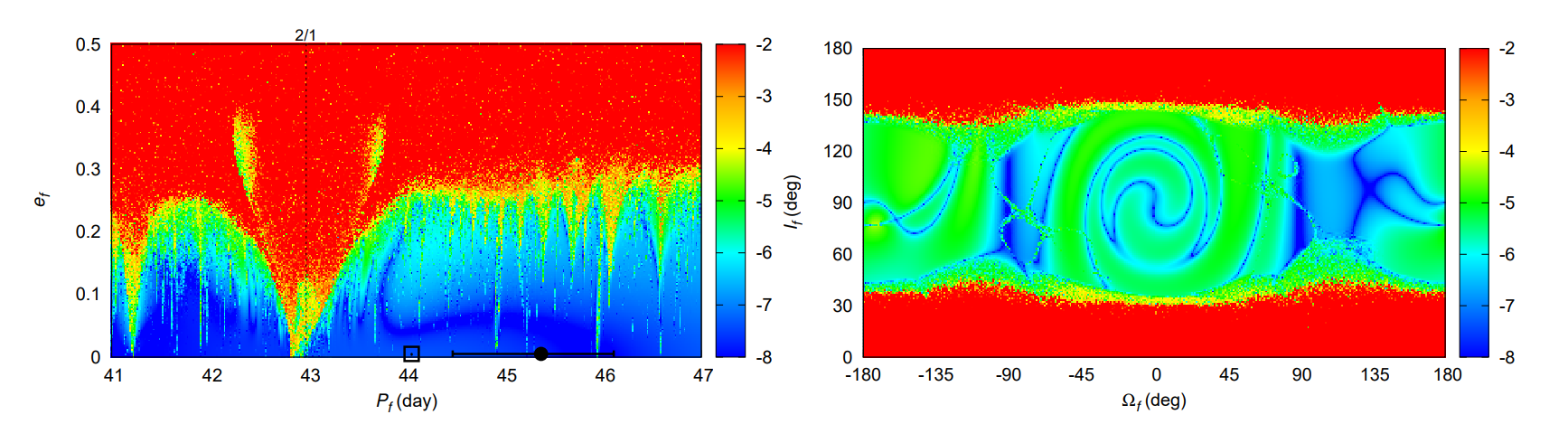
Stability analysis of the TOI-5624 planetary system focussing on planet f.

On April 21, 2026, an international team of astronomers led by A. Bonfanti published the final results of the study. This publication officially confirmed the existence of a fifth, non-transiting planet, TOI-5624 f, which is in a 2:1 orbital resonance with planet e. The system is often compared to TRAPPIST-1 due to the high precision in determining the planets' physical parameters. It serves as a key object for testing models of planetary system formation and studying how sub-Neptunes retain or lose their gaseous envelopes under stellar radiation.

The TOI-5624 planetary system
Companion (in order from star)	Mass	Semimajor axis (AU)	Orbital period (days)	Eccentricity	Inclination (°)	Radius
b	9.4±1.4 M_{🜨}	0.04201+0.00041 −0.00043	3.3903473±0.0000054	0	89.41+0.41 −0.51	2.314±0.035 R_{🜨}
c	4.8±1.8 M_{🜨}	0.07374+0.00072 −0.00075	7.885385±0.000018	0	89.58+0.28 −0.27	2.474±0.042 R_{🜨}
d	4.9±2.2 M_{🜨}	0.1067+0.0010 −0.0011	13.731468+0.000042 −0.000041	0	89.69+0.20 −0.18	3.584+0.051 −0.050 R_{🜨}
e	8.9+2.9 −3.0 M_{🜨}	0.1439+0.0014 −0.0015	21.489936±0.000029	0	89.405+0.049 −0.047	3.247+0.042 −0.043 R_{🜨}
f	13.0±3.7 M_{🜨}	0.2366+0.0040 −0.0041	45.37+0.74 −0.90	0	—	—

== See also ==
- List of multiplanetary systems
- Transit-timing variation
- TRAPPIST-1
