= TOI-5624 c =

Sub-neptune orbiting TOI-5624

Discovery
- Discovered by: Andrea Bonfant et al.
- Discovery site: Transiting Exoplanet Survey Satellite
- Discovery date: April 22, 2026
- Detection method: Transit

Orbital characteristics
- Semi-major axis: 0.07374+0.00072 −0.00075 AU
- Eccentricity: 0 (fixed)
- Orbital period (sidereal): 7.885385±0.000018 d
- Inclination: 89.58+0.28 −0.27
- Argument of perihelion: 90 (fixed)
- Semi-amplitude: 1.70+0.69 −0.68 m/s
- Star: TOI-5624

Physical characteristics
- Mean radius: 2.474±0.042 R_{🜨}
- Mass: 4.8±1.9 M_{🜨}
- Mean density: 1.72+0.70 −0.69 g/cm^{3}
- Temperature: 857 ± 11 K (583.9 ± 11.0 °C; 1,082.9 ± 19.8 °F)

TOI-5624 c is the second closest of the discovered exoplanets orbiting the star TOI-5624, located approximately 331 light-years from Earth in the constellation Ursa Major. The planet was confirmed in April 2026 using the transit method.

== Characteristics ==
=== Physical characteristics ===
Size comparison
Neptune	TOI-5624 с
Neptune	Exoplanet

The planet is classified as a sub-Neptune, with a mass of 4.8±1.9 M_{🜨} determined by the radial velocity method, and a radius of 2.474±0.042 R_{🜨} determined by the CHEOPS telescope, with an uncertainty of less than 1.7%. The object's average density is 1.72+0.70
−0.69 g/cm^{3}. Such a low value indicates a higher proportion of volatiles or a hydrogen-helium mixture in its composition.

=== Orbit ===
The orbital period around its host star is approximately 7.885385±0.000018 Earth days. The semi-major axis of the orbit is estimated to be 0.07374+0.00072
−0.00075 AU. The equilibrium temperature is approximately 858 K, or 584 °C.

== See also ==
- List of exoplanets discovered in 2026
- Methods of detecting exoplanets
