= Toy Freaks =

Defunct YouTube channel

Gregory Chism
- Born: Granite City, Illinois, U.S.
- Occupation: YouTuber
- Children: 2

YouTube information
- Channels: Don't Be Scared Lawn Care; Freak World
- Years active: 2012–2017
- Genres: Children-Comedy; Slapstick
- Subscribers: 10.5 million
- Views: 6.9 billion
- Last updated: November 2017

Toy Freaks was a YouTube channel run by Gregory Chism, a single father of two living in Granite City, Illinois. The channel featured videos of Chism and his daughters, Victoria and Annabelle, in a variety of situations that many viewers found disturbing or inhumane. It was created in 2012 and terminated by YouTube in November 2017. The channel has been described as one of the first channels brought to light with the Elsagate phenomenon.

== Controversy and termination ==
In November 2017, the Toy Freaks channel was highlighted by James Bridle in a Medium article, in which he wrote that the channel "... specialises in gross-out situations, as well as activities which many, many viewers feel border on abuse and exploitation, if not cross the line entirely, including videos of the children vomiting and in pain." When the channel was terminated by YouTube later that month, it had over 8.5 million subscribers, and was one of the 100 most-viewed channels on YouTube. YouTube removed the channel for violating its child endangerment policy, which they had recently revised in response to media coverage of supposedly child-friendly videos containing disturbing content on YouTube.

Law enforcement struggled with how to go about handling the situation. YouTube contacted the National Center for Missing and Exploited Children (NCMEC) which referred the case to the Granite City, Illinois police department. Chism's company, Freak Media, LLC., was registered in Illinois but he resided in Missouri. The Granite City police did not file any charges because they believed there was no "probable cause" for arrest by Granite City PD, citing the videos being shot outside of Granite City and saying that "Everyone is disturbed by this but finding the proper criminal aspect to being a bad parent at times is challenging." They referred the videos back to the NCMEC for investigation in a different jurisdiction, but NCMEC did not know what to do with them, saying they were "kind of outside the scope of what NCMEC deals with specifically." NCMEC referred the case to St. Charles PD, who determined the videos did not violate the law. In a statement to Buzzfeed, a representative of the St. Charles PD said, "St. Charles County Police Department is not investigating Mr. Chism or the Toy Freaks YouTube channel."

== Jon Ronson Investigation ==
Journalist Jon Ronson interviewed Chism as part of his book The Castle: Adventures in a World of Unraveling Men as part of his investigation into modern masculinity. Chism specifically is cited as an example of a man who attempted to enter the creator economy, only to fail. In the book, Chism contends that YouTube directly encouraged content and titles of videos (going so far as to enroll him in an online course run by YouTube and provide an personal adviser) as a way to increase engagement through search engine optimization. He further claims that many of the videos which were perceived as distressing were old videos from when he used the channel as an online repository for family videos (including an infamous video of his youngest daughter bleeding from the mouth due to a shed baby tooth). Ronson is critical of YouTube Kids' decision to use algorithmic curation with little to no human oversight, which led to Toy Freaks being used as a stepping stone for more bizarre and distressing content. Chism regrets creation of the channel despite the money he earned in the process, admitting that some of the videos were "mistake(s)" and stating, "I’d give it all up for it to never have happened." His daughters are weakly positive to ambivalent regarding their participation in Toy Freaks, though they recognize in hindsight that they likely should have not have participated in the videos as children.
