= Discovery (observation) =

Act of detecting something new

Discovery is the act of detecting something new, or something previously unrecognized as meaningful. In the sciences and other academic disciplines, discovery is the observation of new phenomena, new actions, or new events and involves providing new reasoning to explain the knowledge gathered through such observations, using knowledge previously acquired through abstract thought and from everyday experiences.

Some discoveries represent a radical breakthrough in knowledge or technology. Others are based on earlier discoveries, collaborations or ideas. In such cases, the process of discovery requires at least the awareness that an existing concept or method could be modified or transformed. New discoveries are made using various senses, and are usually added to pre-existing knowledge. Questioning plays a key role in discovery; discoveries are often made due to questions. Some discoveries lead to the invention of objects, processes, or techniques.

== Science ==
Within scientific disciplines, discovery is the observation of new phenomena, actions, or events that help explain the knowledge gathered through previously acquired scientific evidence. Discovery is made by providing observational evidence and attempting to develop an initial, rough understanding of some phenomenon.

Within the field of particle physics, there is an accepted requirement for defining a discovery: a five-sigma level of certainty. This level defines how statistically unlikely it is that an experimental result is due to chance. The combination of a five-sigma level of certainty and independent confirmation by other experiments turns findings into accepted discoveries.

== Education ==
Within the field of education, discovery occurs through observations. These observations are common and come in various forms. They can be observations of students done by the teacher or observations of teachers done by other professionals. Student observations help teachers identify where the students are developmentally and cognitively in the course of their studies. Teacher observations are used by administrators to hold teachers accountable for staying on target with their goals, in terms of how they teach and how they treat students.

=== Observations of students completed by teachers ===
Teachers observe students throughout the day in the classroom. These observations can be informal or formal, and often involve the use of checklists, anecdotal notes, videos, interviews, written work, assessments, etc. By completing these observations, teachers can evaluate at what 'level' a student is understanding the lessons. Observations allow teachers to make necessary adaptations for the students in the classroom. These observations can also provide the foundation for strong relationships between teachers and students. When students have such relationships with teachers, they feel safer and more comfortable in the classroom and are more willing and eager to learn. Through observations, teachers identify the most developmentally appropriate practices to implement in their classrooms. These encourage and promote healthier learning styles and positive classroom atmospheres.

=== Observations of teachers completed by other professionals ===
With an educational system, government officials set different academic standards that teachers are expected to follow as a guideline for developmentally appropriate instruction. Teachers are also observed by administrators to ensure that classroom environments are positive. One of the tools used by teachers is the Classroom Assessment Scoring System (CLASS) tool. Informed by findings emerging from the use of this tool, "over 150 research studies prove that students in classrooms with high-CLASS scores have better academic and social outcomes." This tool focuses on encouraging positive classroom environments, regard for students' perspectives, behavior management skills, quality of feedback, and language modeling. Administrators rate each of ten categories on a scale of one to seven, one being the lowest score and seven being the highest score that a teacher may receive.

== Exploration ==
Western culture has used the term "discovery" in their histories to lay claims over lands and people as "discovery" through discovery doctrines and subtly emphasize the importance of "exploration" in the history of the world, such as in the "Age of Discovery", the New World and any frontierist endeavour even into space as the "New Frontier". In the course of this discovery, it has been used to describe the first incursions of peoples from one culture into the geographical and cultural environment of others. However, calling it "discovery" has been rejected by many indigenous peoples, from whose perspective it was not a discovery but a first contact, and consider the term "discovery" to perpetuate colonialism, as for the discovery doctrine and frontierist concepts like terra nullius.

Discovery and the age of discovery have been alternatively, particularly regionally, referred to through the terms contact, Age of Contact or Contact Period.

== See also ==
- Bold hypothesis
- Category:Discoverers
- Category:Lists of inventions or discoveries
- Creativity techniques
- Contact zone
- List of German inventions and discoveries
- List of multiple discoveries
- Multiple discovery
- Revelation
- Rights of nature
- Role of chance in scientific discoveries
- Scientific priority
- Serendipity
- Timeline of scientific discoveries
- USSR state registry of discoveries

== Sources ==
- B Barber (1 September 1961). "Resistance by scientists to scientific discovery". Science. 134 (3479): 596–602. Bibcode:1961Sci...134..596B. doi:10.1126/science.134.3479.596. PMID 13686762.
- Merton, Robert K. (December 1957). "Priorities in scientific discovery: a chapter in the sociology of science" (PDF). American Sociological Review. 22 (6): 635–659. doi:10.2307/2089193. ISSN 0003-1224. JSTOR 2089193. S2CID 147253305. Archived from the original (PDF) on 13 January 2021.
- Carnegie Mellon University Artificial Intelligence and Psychology Project; Yulin Qin; Herbert A Simon (1990). "Laboratory replication of scientific discovery processes". Cognitive Science. 14 (2): 281–312. doi:10.1016/0364-0213(90)90005-H. OCLC 832091458. (preprint)
- A Silberschatz; A Tuzhilin (December 1996). "What makes patterns interesting in knowledge discovery systems". IEEE Transactions on Knowledge and Data Engineering. 8 (6): 970–974. doi:10.1109/69.553165. S2CID 11430349.
- Tomasz Imielinski; Heikki Mannila (November 1996). "A database perspective on knowledge discovery". Communications of the ACM. 39 (11): 58–64. doi:10.1145/240455.240472. S2CID 7530194.
