= TOI-5624 d =

Puffy sub-neptune orbiting TOI-5624

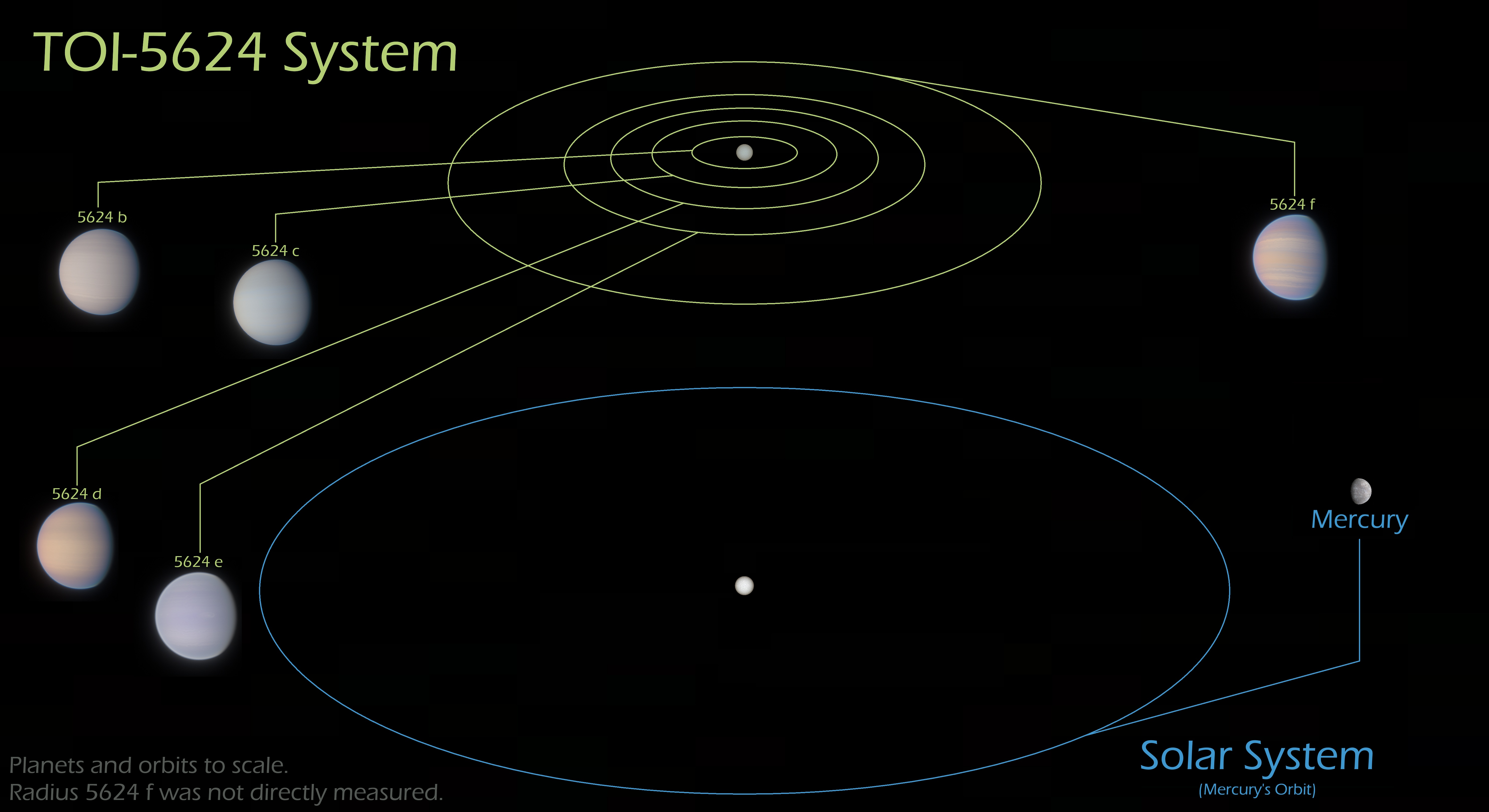
- Artistic depiction of the TOI-5624 system (sizes to scale) compared to Mercury's orbit. TOI-5624 d is the third and largest planet in the system, designated as 5624 d.

Discovery
- Discovered by: Andrea Bonfant et al.
- Discovery site: Transiting Exoplanet Survey Satellite
- Discovery date: April 22, 2026
- Detection method: Transit

Orbital characteristics
- Semi-major axis: 0.1067+0.0010 −0.0011 AU
- Eccentricity: 0 (fixed)
- Orbital period (sidereal): 13.731468+0.000042 −0.000041 d
- Inclination: 89.69+0.20 −0.18
- Argument of perihelion: 90 (fixed)
- Semi-amplitude: 1.45±0.65 m/s
- Star: TOI-5624

Physical characteristics
- Mean radius: 3.584+0.051 −0.050 R_{🜨}
- Mass: 4.9±2.2 M_{🜨}
- Mean density: 0.59+0.27 −0.26 g/cm^{3}
- Temperature: 712.6+9.5 −9.4 K (439.45 °C; 823.01 °F)

TOI-5624 d is the third and largest discovered exoplanet orbiting the star TOI-5624, with a size approximately three and a half times the diameter of Earth. The planet was confirmed in late April 2026 using the transit method.

== Characteristics ==
=== Physical characteristics ===
Size comparison
Neptune	TOI-5624 d
Neptune	Exoplanet

This planet is a puffy sub-Neptune. Its mass equals 4.9±2.2 M_{🜨}, and its radius is 3.584+0.051
−0.050 R_{🜨}. This makes it the largest in radius among the four transiting bodies in the system. The average density is extremely low, about 0.59+0.27
−0.26 g/cm^{3}, which is comparable to the density of Saturn. This suggests the presence of an extended and massive atmosphere, constituting a significant part of the planet's volume. Consequently, the planet has a high transmission signal, making it a priority target for atmospheric studies using the James Webb Space Telescope.

=== Orbit ===
The planet's orbital period is 13.731468+0.000042
−0.000041 Earth days at an average distance from its parent star of 0.1067+0.0010
−0.0011 AU . The equilibrium temperature is estimated at 712.6 K, or 439.45 °C.

== See also ==
- List of exoplanets discovered in 2026
- Methods of detecting exoplanets
