= TOI-5624 e =

Sub-neptune orbiting TOI-5624

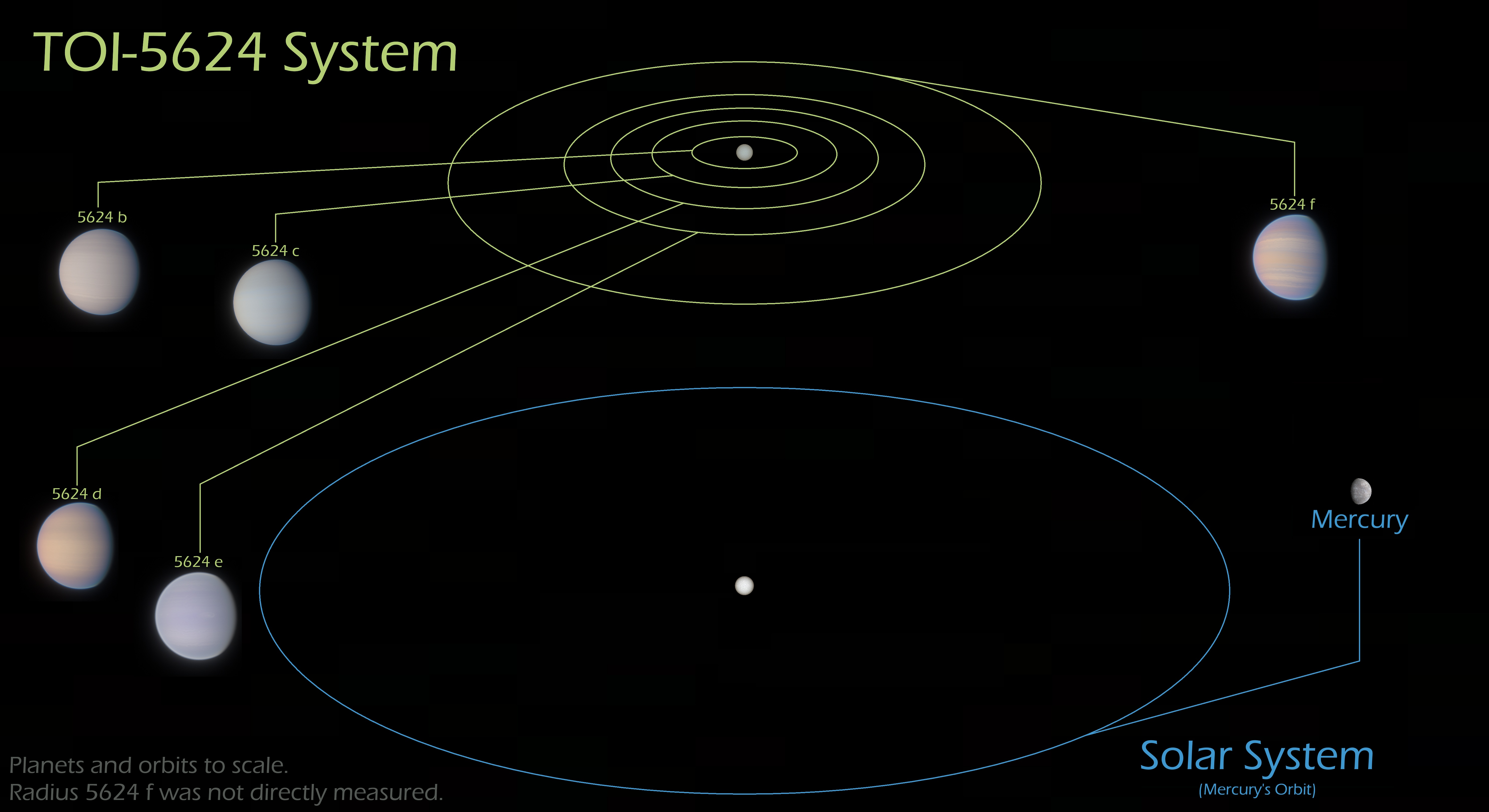
- Artistic depiction of the TOI-5624 system (sizes to scale) compared to Mercury's orbit. TOI-5624 e is the fourth planet in the system, designated as 5624 e.

Discovery
- Discovered by: Andrea Bonfant et al.
- Discovery site: Transiting Exoplanet Survey Satellite
- Discovery date: April 22, 2026
- Detection method: Transit

Orbital characteristics
- Semi-major axis: 0.1439+0.0014 −0.0015 AU
- Eccentricity: 0 (fixed)
- Orbital period (sidereal): 21.489936±0.000029 d
- Inclination: 89.405+0.049 −0.047
- Argument of perihelion: 90 (fixed)
- Semi-amplitude: 2.27+0.74 −0.75 m/s
- Star: TOI-5624

Physical characteristics
- Mean radius: 3.247+0.042 −0.043 R_{🜨}
- Mass: 8.9+2.9 −3.0 M_{🜨}
- Mean density: 1.46±0.48 g/cm^{3}
- Temperature: 613.8+8.2 −8.1 K (340.65 °C; 645.17 °F)

TOI-5624 e is the fourth and the second largest exoplanet discovered in the TOI-5624 system, located approximately 331 light-years from Earth in the constellation Ursa Major. The discovery of the object was officially announced by an international team of astronomers led by Andrea Bonfant in late April 2026. The planet was detected using the transit method.

== Characteristics ==
=== Physical characteristics ===
Size comparison
Neptune	TOI-5624 e
Neptune	Exoplanet

The planet belongs to the class of sub-Neptunes. Its mass, determined by the radial velocity method, is 8.9+2.9
−3.0 M_{🜨}. Using the European CHEOPS telescope, the planet's radius was determined with an uncertainty of less than 1.7%, which is 3.247+0.042
−0.043 R_{🜨}. The average density of the object is approximately 1.46±0.48 g/cm^{3}, indicating the presence of a significant gaseous envelope or an icy component in its structure. Its equilibrium temperature is estimated at 613.8 K, which is about 341 °C.

=== Orbit ===
The planet orbits its parent star with an orbital period of 21.489936±0.000029 d, and its orbit is at a distance of 0.1439+0.0014
−0.0015 AU from the star. The orbital inclination, equal to 89.405+0.049
−0.047, ensures that the planet passes almost through the center of the stellar disk.

Despite this, the orbit of TOI-5624 e is characterized by pronounced short-term dynamical instability. Observations have revealed significant transit timing variations (TTVs) with an amplitude of about 80 minutes. This effect is caused by gravitational interaction with the outer, non-transiting planet TOI-5624 f. Data analysis has shown that the pair of planets e and f is in a configuration close to a 2:1 mean orbital resonance. The orbital period of the outer planet is 45.37 days, which creates regular gravitational perturbations that periodically accelerate and decelerate the motion of TOI-5624 e along its orbit.

== See also ==
- List of exoplanets discovered in 2026
- Methods of detecting exoplanets
- TOI-5624 f
