= Ad fraud =

Fraudulent activity regarding online advertisements

Ad fraud is the practice of fraudulently creating or simulating online advertisement impressions, clicks, conversions, or data events in order to generate revenue. Ad fraud is the categorical term inclusive of all forms of online advertising fraud, including click fraud. While ad fraud is frequently associated with banner ads, video ads, and in-app ads, click fraud has been associated with search marketing, mobile advertising, and conversion fraud with affiliate marketing.

Ad fraud is a type of cybercrime. A successful ad-fraud campaign generally involves a sophisticated combination of identity fraud and attribution fraud: for instance, sending fake traffic through bots using fake social accounts and falsified cookies; bots will click on the ads available on a scam page that is faking a famous brand.

== History ==
Research papers covered the topic at least as early as 1999. In 2004, Google's CFO George Reyes said that click fraud was the biggest threat to the Internet economy.

In 2016, HP Enterprise in its Business of Hacking report highlighted ad fraud as the easiest and the most lucrative form of cybercrime at that time. That year, the World Federation of Advertisers published its first guidance on ad fraud to advise its members on how to counter the problem that was allegedly eating close to US$20 billion of member ad budgets in 2015. As of 2016, there were four notable non-profit organizations focused on creating awareness and availability of resources for countering ad fraud: Botlab, JiCWEBS, Media Rating Council (MRC), and Trustworthy Accountability Group (TAG). Each published various guidelines and commentaries on ad fraud, most notable of which was the Media Rating Council's Invalid Traffic Detection Guidelines.

In 2017, P&G and Chase suspended their digital ad budget of $200 million and reduced their ad shares from 400 thousand to 5 thousand in an attempt to reduce their exposure to ad fraud.

AppsFlyer estimated financial exposure to app install fraud in Q1 of 2018 was as much as $800 million.

A study conducted in 2023 found that the average rate of fraudulent activities in search engine advertisements is approximately 11.5%. This statistic highlights the growing importance of implementing effective fraud protection measures in search engine marketing to combat ad fraud. In 2024, the share of malvertising increased by 10%, with 70% of users distrusting online advertising. A joint study between Juniper Research and Fraud Blocker found the cost of fraud in digital advertising globally was $88 billion in 2023; growing to $172 billion by 2028. Ad fraud is estimated to cost advertisers approximately $100 billion globally in 2024, making it one of the largest sources of financial loss in digital marketing.

== Classifications ==
=== Types of fraud ===
- Bots / Non-human traffic ad fraud
- Click farms ad fraud
- Ad injection fraud
- Domain name spoofing
- Cookie stuffing
- Ad hijacking – When unauthorized parties imitate a brand's paid ads and redirect traffic through their own links to earn commissions or steal clicks.

=== Sources of traffic ===
- Botnets
- Browser toolbars
- Infected software (malware)
- Paid to click (PTC) websites
- Click farms

=== Formats ===
- Banner
- Video
- In-app
- Social

=== Types of mobile ad fraud ===
Category	Description	Types
Attribution fraud	Attribution fraud is when a real user downloads an app and a fraudster attempts to claim attribution for that install. Attribution fraud sees the advertiser pay for a user it attracted through other channels.	Types of attribution fraud: Click spam; Ad stacking; Click injection; In-app event; Evasion techniques
Install fraud	Install fraud is when app installs are not from genuine app users. These installs may be from bots or from people that are not its intended users. These installs do not deliver return on ad spend (ROAS).	Types of install fraud: App install farms; SDK spoofing; Evasion techniques

=== Sourced traffic ===
The Association of National Advertisers reported that sourced traffic, a practice where companies partaking in the formal online advertising market buy fraudulent traffic to resell it as legitimate, was a notable form of ad fraud. Sourced traffic has been mistakenly referred to as arbitrage, because buying sourced traffic does not have any potential for return whereas in financial markets arbitrage refers to "risk-free" trading of legitimate assets. While there is no evidence to support the claim, and such evidence would be impossible to conclusively gather, it may be that sourced traffic represents lion's share of the ad fraud market due to the ease and popularity of acquiring and reselling it. The only evidence-based study to sourced traffic found in 2016 that around 50% of the acquired traffic was originating from data center IP addresses and that selected ad fraud verification vendors Integral Ad Science and Moat largely failed to detect it as ad fraud. The report also showed that sourced traffic could be acquired for as low as $0.001 per click, in contrast to the going price per click in the formal market, which is typically $1 or more.
