= World Federation of Advertisers =

Global trade association for advertisers

World Federation of Advertisers (WFA)
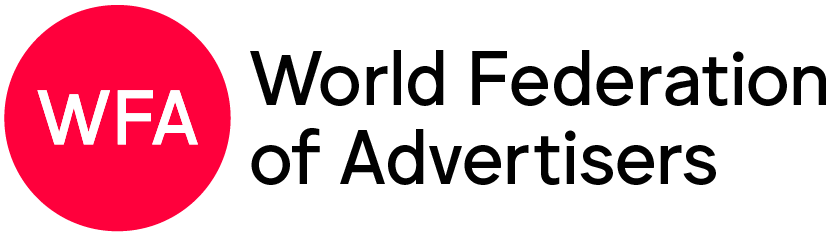
- Formerly: Union Internationale des Associations d'Annonceurs (UIAA)
- Type: Professional association
- Industry: Advertising
- Founded: 14 May 1953; 73 years ago in Stresa, Italy
- Headquarters: Brussels, Belgium
- Key people: Stephan Loerke (CEO); David Wheldon (president)
- Website: www.wfanet.org

The World Federation of Advertisers (WFA) is a global association for multinational marketers and national advertiser associations. Its membership is made up of over 140 of the world's top brands and national associations in more than 60 markets. WFA's aim is to champion effective and sustainable marketing communications worldwide.

WFA is based in Brussels, Belgium, and has offices in London, New York and Singapore.

== History ==
WFA was founded in Stresa, Italy, on 14 May 1953 as the Union Internationale des Associations d'Annonceurs (UIAA) at the initiative of ten existing national advertiser associations representing Belgium, Denmark, France, Germany, India, Italy, Luxembourg, Netherlands, Sweden, Switzerland, and the UK. In 1984, at the Rio de Janeiro World Congress, the UIAA changed its name to the World Federation of Advertisers (WFA) and opened its doors to corporate members.

== Global Alliance for Responsible Media ==
On 18 June 2019, WFA formed the Global Alliance for Responsible Media (GARM), a global cross-industry alliance which aimed to improve digital safety and eliminate harmful online content. This followed WFA's earlier call

to put pressure on platforms to do more to prevent their services and algorithms from being hijacked by those with malicious intent. The call comes after multiple incidents on some of the world’s biggest digital platforms, including paedophile comments being left in comments below videos of children on YouTube, the glorification of self-harm and suicide content on Instagram and, most recently, the live-streaming of the terrorist attack in Christchurch, New Zealand on Facebook.

GARM was made up of advertisers, agencies, media companies, platforms and industry organisations and was part of the World Economic Forum's Platform for Shaping the Future of Media, Entertainment and Culture. In 2022, the alliance introduced guidelines concerning misinformation and new standards on ad placements.

=== Legal issues ===
In 2024, the United States House Committee on the Judiciary released a report claiming that GARM had coordinated with large corporations, advertising agencies, and industry associations to withhold spending on advertisements that would fund online content they disfavored because it was conservative. Following antitrust lawsuits from Elon Musk's Twitter and online video site Rumble, the WFA shut GARM down. WFA said the lawsuit misconstrued the purposes of GARM, which it was forced to shut down due to the costs associated with the lawsuit.

== Other activities ==
In 2019, WFA formed a steering group of advertisers and national associations to develop a set of global principles for cross-media measurement for the media ecosystem. In September 2020, an industry framework was released, which aims to set the parameters for cross-media measurement solutions. Digital platforms including Google and Meta were involved in the development of a technical proposal that meet the principles outlined in the WFA framework.

WFA is a founding member of the Unstereotype Alliance, UN Women's flagship partnership with the marketing industry to eradicate harmful gender stereotypes in advertising, launched during the 2017 Cannes Lions International Festival of Creativity. It is also a founding member of the Coalition for Better Ads, a cross-industry initiative to improve consumers’ experience with online advertising.

Each year the WFA holds Global Marketer Week, a series of events bringing together brand marketers to learn about the latest public affairs issues and best practice in marketing. In 2013 this event was held in Brussels to celebrate the organisation's 60th anniversary and in 2023 it was held in Istanbul.

WFA also hosts the WFA Global Marketer of the Year award, an annual competition whose aim is to showcase the impact made by global and regional marketers.
