= Alexander Tuzhilin =

American computer scientist (born 1957)

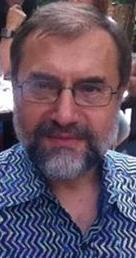
- Born: Alexander Sergei Tuzhilin; 1957 (age 68–69)
- Education: New York University (S.B. 1980); Stanford University (S.B. 1981); Courant Institute of Mathematical Sciences (Ph.D. 1989)
- Scientific career
- Fields: Information Systems, data mining
- Workplaces: New York University Stern School of Business; University of the People
- Thesis: Using relational discrete event systems and models for prediction of future behavior of databases (1989)
- Doctoral advisor: Zvi Kedem

Alexander Sergei Tuzhilin (born 1957) is a Professor of Data Science and Information Systems and the Leonard N. Stern Endowed Professor of Business at New York University's Stern School of Business. He also serves as the Dean of Computer Science at the University of the People on the pro bono basis.

Professor Tuzhilin is known for his work on personalization, recommender systems, machine learning and AI, where he has made several contributions, including being instrumental in developing the area of Context-Aware Recommender Systems (CARS), proposing novel methods of providing unexpected and cross-domain recommendations based on the principles of deep-learning, developing novel approaches to customer segmentation, and discovery of unexpected patterns in data.

== Education ==
Tuzhilin received his B.A. in Mathematics from the New York University in 1980, M.S. in Engineering Economics from the Department of Management Science and Engineering at Stanford University in 1981, and Ph.D. in computer science from NYU's Courant Institute of Mathematical Sciences in 1989, his doctoral advisor being Zvi Kedem.

== Career ==
Tuzhilin joined the faculty at the New York University Stern School of Business in 1989 as an Assistant Professor of Information Systems. He is currently the Leonard N. Stern Professor of Business. He is also the Dean of Computer Science at the University of the People.

=== Research ===
Tuzhilin researches data mining in databases, personalization, recommender systems, and customer relationship management.

In 2006, Tuzhilin was hired by Google and given access to its monitoring systems to do a study on click fraud. This was part of a class-action settlement requiring Google to offer advertisers up to $60 million in refunds. Tuzhilin concluded that defining and tracking click fraud will be difficult, because it is often not possible to decipher whether Web surfers were clicking on an advertising link out of malice or as part of an innocent online excursion.

=== Patents ===
In 2001, Tuzhilin patented a method of building customer profiles and using them to recommend products and services. Tuzhilin said of the patent, 'It's very broad and very general, and occupies some prime real estate in this space. It essentially covers technologies that are crucial for implementation of customer relationship management.' He added that the patent was careful not to stipulate that the technology was designed for Internet applications. Others pointed out that there were legal exceptions to business methods patents. Any individuals or companies that can show they have been engaged in a business practice for at least a year before a patent application for that practice was filed may be able to circumvent the patent.

In March 2012, Yahoo sued Facebook for violating 10 of its patents. Facebook countersued Yahoo, claiming that it violated Facebook patents that covered 80% of the Yahoo's 2011 revenues. Three of Facebook's patents were originally granted to Tuzhilin.
