= YouTube Kids =

Family-friendly version of YouTube

- Logo as of 2019

- Screenshot of the home page of YouTube Kids
- Website type: Video hosting service
- Founded: February 24, 2015; 11 years ago
- Headquarters: United States
- Area served: See list
- Owner: Alphabet, Inc.
- Key people: Neal Mohan (CEO)
- Industry: Internet; Video hosting service
- Parent: Google (through YouTube LLC)
- Website: www.youtubekids.com
- IPv6 support: Yes
- Advertising: Google AdSense
- Current status: Active
- Content license: Proprietary

YouTube Kids is an American video app and website developed by YouTube, a subsidiary of Google. The app provides a version of the service oriented solely towards children, with curated selections of content, parental control features, and filtering of videos deemed inappropriate for viewing by children under the age of 13.

First released on February 24, 2015, as an Android and iOS mobile app, YouTube Kids became available via the web in August 2019, and was made available as part of the main YouTube app on smart TV and digital media player platforms in 2023 (replacing the existing standalone app for LG, Samsung, and Sony smart TVs, and later Android TV and Apple TV, which were discontinued in July 2024).

YouTube Kids has faced criticism from advocacy groups, particularly the Fairplay Organization, for concerns surrounding the app's use of commercial advertising, as well as algorithmic suggestions of videos that may be inappropriate for the app's target audience, as the app has been associated with a controversy surrounding disturbing or violent videos depicting characters from children's media franchises. Criticism over the videos led YouTube to announce that it would take more stringent actions to review and filter such videos when reported by the community, and prevent them from being accessible from within the YouTube Kids app.

== Features ==
=== Content ===
The app is divided into four content categories; “Recommended” "Shows", "Music", and "Learning". The categories feature curated selections of content from channels deemed appropriate for children.

In August 2016, the app was updated to support the YouTube Red (now YouTube Premium) subscription service, allowing ad-free playback, background playback, and offline playback for subscribers. In February 2017, YouTube began to introduce premium original series oriented specifically towards YouTube Kids, including DanTDM Creates a Big Scene, Fruit Ninja: Frenzy Force, Hyperlinked, and Kings of Atlantis. YouTube has also presented advocacy campaigns through special playlists featured on YouTube Kids, including "#ReadAlong" (a series of videos, primarily featuring kinetic typography) to promote literacy, "#TodayILearned" (which featured a playlist of STEM-oriented programs and videos), and "Make it Healthy, Make it Fun" (a collaboration with Marc and Pau Gasol to promote healthy living and an active lifestyle to children).

In November 2017, the app was updated to add additional user interface modes designed for different age groups, ranging from the existing simplified interface (intended for younger children) to a more dense interface designed for older children.

In September 2018, YouTube added new age group options relating to the content offered in the app, "Younger" and "Older". "Younger" maintains the existing mix of content offered before, and "Older" adds more content from other genres, such as nature, gaming, and music. In August 2019, the "Younger" setting was split to add a new "Preschool" group, with a focus on "creativity, playfulness, learning, and exploration".

In February 2024, YouTube announced that the separate YouTube Kids app would be discontinued on digital media players and smart TVs in July of that year.

=== Parental controls ===
The YouTube Kids app features parental control settings that allow parents to limit screen time, and restrict users from accessing the search tool. Parents can use a passcode or their Google account to protect these settings, and configure profiles for multiple users to tailor their experiences.

== Reception ==
=== Advertising ===
The Campaign for a Commercial-Free Childhood (CCFC) and the Center for Digital Democracy (CDD) both expressed concern over the use of advertising within the YouTube Kids app, arguing that children would not be able to distinguish the ads from content. Short bumpers were later added to the app to establish a separation between advertising and content.

=== Filtering issues ===
The YouTube Kids app has faced criticism over the accessibility of videos that are inappropriate for its target audience. The CCFC filed an FTC complaint over YouTube Kids shortly after its release, citing examples of inappropriate videos that were accessible via the app's search tool (such as those related to wine in their testing), and the Recommended page eventually using search history to surface such videos. YouTube defended the criticism, stating that it was developed in consultation with other advocacy groups, and that the company was open to feedback over the app's operation. A larger YouTube controversy referred to as "Elsagate" discovered by Matan Uziel and Charlie Warzel has also been associated with the app, referring to channels which post videos featuring characters from popular franchises (especially, among others, Frozen, Paw Patrol, Thomas & Friends, Peppa Pig, and Spider-Man), but with disturbing, sexually suggestive, violent, or otherwise inappropriate themes and content.

YouTube global head of family and children's content Malik Ducard admitted that "making the app family friendly is of the utmost importance to us", but admitted that the service was not curated all the time, and that parents had the responsibility to use the app's parental controls to control how it is used by their children (including disabling access to the search tool). Josh Golin, director of the Campaign for a Commercial-Free Childhood, argued that automated algorithms were not enough to determine whether a video is age-appropriate, and that the process required manual curation. He added that "the YouTube model has created something, which is so vast, but there are 400 hours of content are uploaded every minute. It's simply too big. People have been raising these issues for years, just visit any parenting forum and they’ve been talking about the fake Peppa Pig videos."

In November 2017, YouTube announced that it would take further steps to review and filter videos reported by users as containing inappropriate content, including more stringent use of its filtering and age-restriction system to prevent such videos from appearing on the app and YouTube proper. In an update to the YouTube Kids app that month, a more prominent disclaimer was added to its first-time setup process, stating that the service cannot fully guarantee the appropriateness of videos that were not manually curated, and informing parents of means to report and block videos that they do not find suitable.

These options expanded further in 2018, with the addition of an option to restrict users to human-reviewed channels and recommendations, as well as a manual whitelisting system.

== Geographic availability ==
Countries in which YouTube Kids is available

Country	Android	iOS	Website	Television
Algeria	check	check	check	X mark
American Samoa	X mark	X mark	check	X mark
Argentina	check	check	check	check
Aruba	check	X mark	check	(Note: Android TV only)
Australia	check	check	check	check
Austria	check	check	check	check
Azerbaijan	check	check	check	check
Bahrain	check	check	check	X mark
Bangladesh	check	X mark	check	check
Belarus	check	check	check	check
Belgium	check	check	check	check
Bermuda	check	check	check	check
Bolivia	check	check	check	check
(Bosnia and Herzegovina) Bosnia	check	check	check	check
Brazil	check	check	check	check
Bulgaria	check	check	check	check
Canada	(Note: excluding Quebec)	check	check	check
Cayman Islands	check	check	check	check
Chile	check	check	check	check
Colombia	check	check	check	check
Costa Rica	check	check	check	check
Croatia	check	check	check	check
Cyprus	check	check	check	check
Czech Republic	check	check	check	check
Denmark	check	check	check	check
Dominican Republic	check	check	check	check
Ecuador	check	check	check	check
Egypt	check	check	check	X mark
El Salvador	check	check	check	check
Estonia	check	check	check	check
Finland	check	check	check	check
France	check	check	check	check
French Guiana	X mark	X mark	check	X mark
French Polynesia	X mark	X mark	check	X mark
(Georgia (country)) Georgia	check	check	check	check
Germany	check	check	check	check
Ghana	check	check	check	check
Greece	check	check	check	check
Guadeloupe	X mark	X mark	check	X mark
Guam	X mark	X mark	check	X mark
Guatemala	check	check	check	check
Honduras	check	check	check	check
Hong Kong	check	check	check	check
Hungary	check	check	check	check
Iceland	check	check	check	check
India	check	check	check	check
Indonesia	check	check	check	check
Iraq	check	check	check	X mark
(Republic of Ireland) Ireland	check	check	check	check
Israel	check	check	check	check
Italy	check	check	check	check
Jamaica	check	check	check	check
Japan	check	check	check	check
Jordan	check	check	check	X mark
Kazakhstan	check	check	check	check
Kenya	check	check	check	check
Kuwait	check	check	check	X mark
Latvia	check	check	check	check
Lebanon	check	check	check	check
Libya	check	check	check	check
Lithuania	check	check	check	check
Liechtenstein	check	X mark	check	check
Luxembourg	check	check	check	check
Malaysia	check	check	check	check
Malta	check	check	check	check
Mexico	check	check	check	check
Montenegro	X mark	check	check	(Note: Apple TVs and Smart TVs only)
Morocco	check	check	check	X mark
Nepal	check	check	check	check
Netherlands	check	check	check	check
New Zealand	check	check	check	check
Nigeria	check	check	check	check
Nicaragua	check	check	check	check
North Macedonia	check	check	check	check
Norway	check	check	check	check
Oman	check	check	check	X mark
Pakistan	check	check	check	check
Panama	check	check	check	check
Papua New Guinea	check	check	check	check
Paraguay	check	check	check	check
Peru	check	check	check	check
Philippines	check	check	check	check
Poland	check	check	check	check
Portugal	check	check	check	check
Qatar	check	check	check	X mark
Romania	check	check	check	check
Russia	check	check	check	check
San Marino	X mark	X mark	check	X mark
Saudi Arabia	check	check	check	X mark
Senegal	check	check	check	check
Serbia	check	check	check	check
Singapore	check	check	check	check
Slovakia	check	check	check	check
Slovenia	check	check	check	check
South Africa	check	check	check	check
South Korea	check	check	check	check
Sri Lanka	check	check	check	check
Spain	check	check	check	check
Sweden	check	check	check	check
Switzerland	check	check	check	check
Taiwan	check	check	check	check
Tanzania	check	check	check	check
Thailand	check	check	check	check
Tunisia	check	check	check	X mark
Turkey	check	check	check	check
Turks and Caicos Islands	check	check	check	check
Uganda	check	check	check	check
Ukraine	check	check	check	check
United Arab Emirates	check	check	check	X mark
United Kingdom	check	check	check	check
United States	check	check	check	check
Uruguay	check	check	check	check
(United States Virgin Islands) U.S. Virgin Islands	X mark	X mark	check	X mark
Vatican City	X mark	X mark	check	X mark
Venezuela	check	check	check	check
Vietnam	check	check	check	check
Yemen	check	check	check	X mark
Zimbabwe	check	check	check	check

YouTube Kids will be available in the Bahamas, Belize, Dominica, Haiti, Moldova, Montenegro, Puerto Rico and Tajikistan in the future.
