= Click farm =

Fraudulent practice involving bot accounts spam clicking ads

A click farm is a form of click fraud where a large group of low-paid workers are hired to click on links or buttons for the click fraudster (click farm master or click farmer). The workers click the links, surf the target website for a period of time, and possibly sign up for newsletters prior to clicking another link. For many of these workers, clicking on enough ads per day may increase their revenue substantially and may also be an alternative to other types of work. It is extremely difficult for an automated filter to detect this simulated traffic as fake because the visitor behavior appears exactly the same as that of an actual legitimate visitor.

Fake likes or reviews generating from click farms are essentially different from those arising from bots, where computer programs are written by software experts. To deal with such issues, companies such as Facebook are trying to create algorithms that seek to wipe out accounts with unusual activity (e.g. liking too many pages in a short period of time).

== Logistics ==
Click farms are usually located in developing countries, such as China, Nepal, Sri Lanka, Egypt, Indonesia, the Philippines, and Bangladesh. The business of click farms extends to generating likes and followers on social media platforms such as Facebook, Twitter, Instagram, Pinterest and more. Workers are paid, on average, one US dollar for a thousand likes or for following a thousand people on Twitter. Then click farms turn around and sell their likes and followers at a much higher price.

In Thailand in June 2017, a click farm was discovered with hundreds of mobile phones and several hundred thousand SIM cards used to build up likes and views on WeChat.

As well as inflating engagement on social media, click farms are used for click fraud and ad fraud practices. This includes inflating the clicks and traffic on websites so that publishers can collect a fraudulent payout. This same traffic can also be hired to damage the paid ad campaigns of business rivals, known as competitor click fraud.

Click farms have also been used to increase the views on everything from Spotify, Twitch and YouTube to creating fake reviews for businesses, products or services.

Many click farms advertise openly on the internet, usually masquerading as genuine traffic sources.

The need for click farming arises because, as The Guardian states, "31% will check ratings and reviews, including likes and Twitter followers, before they choose to buy something." This shows the increasing importance that businesses, celebrities and other organisations put on the number of likes and followers they have. This creates monetary values for likes and followers, which means that businesses and celebrities feel compelled to increase their likes to create a positive online profile.

Pay-per-click providers, including Google, Yahoo!, and MSN, have made substantial efforts to combat click fraud. Automated filters remove most click fraud attempts at the source. Deanna Yick, a spokeswoman for Google, said that “we design our systems to catch bot-related attacks.” “Because a significant amount of malicious traffic is automated, advertisers are protected from these kinds of attacks.” she added. In an effort to circumvent these filtering systems, click fraudsters have begun to use these click farms to mimic actual visitors.

== Implications ==
Engagement rate, a performance metric that measures the quality of social media activity such as Facebook likes or Twitter retweets, can be interpreted in terms of "engagement per follower," measured by dividing the raw counts of social media activity by the number of followers. Users who engage in short term click farms services will see their engagement rate plummet in time as the initial increase in the volume of social media activity drops when the click farms services end, coupled with the increase in fake followers if not the same.

Italian security researchers and bloggers Andrea Stroppa and Carla De Micheli found out in 2013 that $40 million to $360 million to date were earned from the sale of and the potential benefits of buying fake Twitter followers. $200 million a year is also earned from fake Facebook activities. About 40 to 80 percent of Facebook advertisements are bought on a pay-per-click basis. Advertisers have claimed that about 20 percent of Facebook clicks are invalid, and they had tried to seek refunds. This could cost Facebook $2.5 billion of their 2014 revenue.

Some companies have tried to mitigate the effects of click farming. Coca-Cola made its 2010 Super Bowl advert "Hard Times" private after learning it was shared on Shareyt and issued a statement that it "did not approve of fake fans." An online casino with a license to use the Monopoly brand added fake likes to its Facebook page. When Hasbro learned about the fake likes, it contacted Facebook to have the page removed. Hasbro also issued a statement that it was “appalled to hear of what had occurred” and claimed no previous knowledge of the page.

Although click farm services violate many social media user policies, there are no government regulations that render them illegal. However, Sam DeSilva, a lawyer specializing in IT and outsourcing law at Manches LLP in Oxford had mentioned that: "Potentially, a number of laws are being breached – the consumer protection and unfair trading regulations. Effectively, it's misleading the individual consumers."

== Advertising provider responses ==
Facebook issued a statement stating: "A like that doesn't come from someone truly interested in connecting with the brand benefits no one. If you run a Facebook page and someone offers you a boost in your fan count in return for money, our advice is to walk away – not least because it is against our rules and there is a good chance those likes will be deleted by our automatic systems. We investigate and monitor "like-vendors" and if we find that they are selling fake likes, or generating conversations from fake profiles, we will quickly block them from our platform." Andrea Faville reported that Alphabet Inc. companies Google and YouTube "take action against bad actors that seek to game our systems." LinkedIn spokesman Doug Madey said buying connections "dilutes the member experience, violates their user agreement, and can also prompt account closures." Chief executive and founder of Instagram, Kevin Systrom reports "We've been deactivating spammy accounts from Instagram on an ongoing basis to improve your experience."

Facebook's purging of fake likes and accounts occurred from August to September 2012. According to Facebook's 2014 financial report to the Securities and Exchange Commission, an estimated 83 million false accounts were deleted, accounting for approximately 6.4% of the 1.3 billion total accounts on Facebook. Likester reported pages affected include Lady Gaga, who lost 65,505 fans and Facebook, who lost 124,919 fake likes. Technology giant Dell lost 107,889 likes (2.87% of its total likes) in 24 hours. Billions of YouTube video fake views were deleted after being exposed by auditors. In December 2014, Instagram carried out a purge deemed the "Instagram Rapture" wherein many accounts were affected—including Instagram's own account, which lost 18,880,211 followers.

Recent research has indicated that click farms, as well as stand-alone bots, have become easy to identify by the defenses of an ad network, while more sophisticated techniques are still being studied and examined by researchers.

== See also ==
- Computer security
- Content farm
- Link farm
