= List of exoplanets discovered in 2026 =

This list of exoplanets discovered in 2026 is a list of confirmed exoplanets that were first reported in 2026. For exoplanets detected only by radial velocity, the listed value for mass is a lower limit. See Minimum mass for more information. For exoplanets detected only by direct imaging or microlensing without a determined orbit, the listed value for semi-major axis is the projected separation.

Name	Mass (M_{J})	Radius (R_{J})	Period (days)	Semi-major axis (AU)	Temp. (K)	Discovery method	Distance (ly)	Host star mass (M_{☉})	Host star temp. (K)	Remarks
Beta Pictoris d	2.4±0.6	1.26±0.03	33200^{+6600}_{−9900}	26.0^{+2.2}_{−6.1}	600^{+45}_{−60}	imaging	63.4±0.1	1.789^{+0.024}_{−0.027}	8054±96	
DMPP-2c	0.1629^{+0.0171}_{−0.0173}		3.168^{+0.355}_{−0.002}	0.04789^{+0.00327}_{−0.00049}		radial vel.	449.900^{+2.221}_{−2.202}	1.41±0.04	6500±100	
DMPP-2d	0.2888^{+0.0192}_{−0.0230}		16.491^{+0.067}_{−0.053}	0.1432^{+0.0012}_{−0.0013}		radial vel.	449.900^{+2.221}_{−2.202}	1.41±0.04	6500±100	
DMPP-6b	0.0182^{+0.0030}_{−0.0025}		7.6027^{+0.0261}_{−0.0016}	0.00779^{+0.0016}_{−0.0012}		radial vel.	178.167 ^{+0.266}_{−0.265}	1.079±0.045	6182	
DMPP-6c	0.0424^{+0.0050}_{−0.0062}		36.441^{+0.077}_{−0.070}	0.2206^{+0.0033}_{−0.0039}		radial vel.	178.167 ^{+0.266}_{−0.265}	1.079±0.045	6182^{+139}_{−100}	
DMPP-7b	0.21697^{+0.00532}_{−0.00523}		4.92666±0.00030	0.0607±0.0003	1456	radial vel.	330.706 ^{+1.729}_{−1.716}	1.23±0.02	6096±30	
DMPP-8b	0.2551±0.0223		62.915^{+0.041}_{−0.033}	0.3098^{+0.0098}_{−0.0108}		radial vel.	248.319 ^{+0.620}_{−0.617}	0.990±0.040	6009^{+107}_{−147}	
DMPP-9b	0.0454^{+0.0081}_{−0.0074}		12.733^{+0.584}_{−0.524}	0.1097^{+0.0041}_{−0.0037}		radial vel.	357.285 ^{+1.011}_{−1.008}	1.10±0.04	6092^{+131}_{−134}	
Gaia23braL b	1.630^{+0.420}_{−0.378}			4.847^{+0.770}_{−0.808}		microlensing	14123^{+3271}_{−3300}	0.774^{+0.170}_{−0.146}		
GJ 887 d	0.019±0.004		50.77±0.05	0.212^{+0.007}_{−0.008}	241^{+10}_{−9}	radial vel.	10.7241±0.0007	0.495±0.049	3688±86	A super-Earth located in the habitable zone
GJ 887 e	0.00459^{+0.00060}_{−0.00057}		4.4249±0.0001	0.0417^{+0.0014}_{−0.0015}	544^{+21}_{−20}	radial vel.	10.7241±0.0007	0.495±0.049	3688±86	
GJ 1137 c	0.0161±0.0022		9.6412^{+0.0012}_{−0.0011}	0.0835±0.0008		radial vel.	92.91±0.06	0.836^{+0.023}_{−0.025}	5033.8^{+85.7}_{−77.2}	
GJ 3090 c	0.031±0.004		15.9407±0.0058	0.0997±0.0008	407.2±7.4	radial vel.	73.305±0.085	0.519±0.013	3707±32	
GJ 3378 b	0.0072±0.0013		21.45±0.01	0.09673±0.00080	272±7	radial vel.	25.225 ± 0.006	0.262±0.021	3340±60	
GJ 4274 b	0.0093^{+0.0017}_{−0.0016}		1.6339±0.0001	0.0153±0.0008		radial vel.	23.60±0.04	0.18±0.03	3228±19	
GJ 4274 c	0.0264^{+0.0053}_{−0.0049}		69.57^{+0.32}_{−1.14}	0.186±0.010		radial vel.	23.60±0.04	0.18±0.03	3228±19	
HAT-P-47 b	0.206±0.039	1.313±0.045	4.73217441±0.00000055		1605±22	transit	920.661 ^{+15.753}_{−15.238}	1.387±0.038	6703±50	
HD 48265 c	4.45^{+0.75}_{−0.37}		10418^{+2451}_{−1412}	10.4^{+1.6}_{−1.0}		radial vel.	296.3±0.4	1.38±0.06	5805±34	
HD 50554 c	<0.017	0.117±0.005	5.969362±0.000020	0.0652±0.0010		transit	101.34±0.08	1.04±0.05	5968±96	
HD 50554 d	<0.0327	0.126^{+0.013}_{−0.008}	28.06940±0.00040	0.1831±0.0029		transit	101.34±0.08	1.04±0.05	5968±96	
HD 60779 b	0.04465^{+0.00305}_{−0.00302}	0.2896^{+0.0089}_{−0.0087}	29.986175^{+0.000030}_{−0.000033}	0.1922±0.0038	650±10	transit	115.596^{+0.1523}_{−0.1519}	1.050±0.044	6081±60	
HD 60779 c	0.0890±0.0047		104.79±0.23			radial vel.	115.596^{+0.1523}_{−0.1519}	1.050±0.044	6081±60	
HD 68475 b	5.16^{+0.53}_{−0.47}		7832^{+463}_{−323}	7.27^{+0.39}_{−0.36}		radial vel.	109.036 ^{+0.109}_{−0.108}	0.83±0.10	5022±113	
HD 100508 b	1.20^{+0.30}_{−0.18}		5681±42	6.11^{+0.25}_{−0.28}		radial vel.	106.835±0.103	0.94±0.12	5419±112	
HD 114386 c	0.37±0.03		444.00^{+0.93}_{−0.88}	1.05±0.04		radial vel.	91.27±0.05	0.80±0.03	4895±62	
HD 164604 c	9.5±1.2		5387^{+120}_{−127}	5.556^{+0.093}_{−0.100}		radial vel.	130.5±0.2	0.77±0.02	4663±31	
HD 176986 d	0.0213±0029		61.376^{+0.051}_{−0.049}	0.28149±0.00240	363±10	radial vel.	90.96±0.06	0.789±0.019	4931±77	
HIP 8923 b	9.98^{+0.78}_{−0.16}		5160^{+150}_{−240}	5.90^{+0.10}_{−0.22}		radial vel.	215.255 ^{+0.720}_{−0.715}	1.01±0.04	5980±51	
HIP 10090 b	3.87^{+0.65}_{−0.60}		2960^{+120}_{−100}	3.87^{+0.19}_{−0.11}		radial vel.	268.743 ^{+0.961}_{−0.954}	0.94±0.04	5661±72	Also known as HD 13350 b.
HIP 10090 c	0.85^{+0.03}_{−0.12}		321.8^{+0.3}_{−0.6}	0.90±0.01		radial vel.	268.743 ^{+0.961}_{−0.954}	0.94±0.04	5661±72	Also known as HD 13350 c.
HIP 39330 b	1.67^{+0.19}_{−0.08}		4650^{+210}_{−250}	5.05^{+0.23}_{−0.17}		radial vel.	118.716±0.148	0.96±0.04	5748±81	
HIP 98599 b	6.85^{+0.10}_{−0.22}		2656^{+40}_{−16}	3.96^{+0.07}_{−0.01}		radial vel.	247.689 ^{+0.976}_{−0.968}	1.19±0.04	5978±300	
KMT-2016-BLG-1337L b	0.28^{+0.15}_{−0.16}			3.97^{+0.60}_{−0.92}		microlensing	22570^{+3392}_{−5251}	0.54±0.30		A circumbinary planet.
KMT-2020-BLG-0202L b	12.28^{+7.37}_{−5.43}			4.17^{+1.29}_{−1.28}		microlensing	12518^{+3879}_{−3847}	0.81^{+0.49}_{−0.36}		
KMT-2021-BLG-0852L b	0.49±0.17			7.78^{+0.89}_{−1.11}		microlensing	23581^{+2707}_{−3359}	0.75^{+0.26}_{−0.27}		
KMT-2022-BLG-1551L b	2.96^{+1.71}_{−1.53}			2.29^{+0.30}_{−0.44}		microlensing	22494^{+2999}_{−4336}	0.54^{+0.31}_{−0.28}		
KMT-2022-BLG-1818L b	4.00^{+1.24}_{−2.00}			2.6±0.9		microlensing	17286±6197	0.30^{+0.12}_{−0.06}		
KMT-2022-BLG-1818L c	0.36^{+0.30}_{−0.21}			12.6^{+6.0}_{−4.7}		microlensing	17286±6197	0.30^{+0.12}_{−0.06}		
KMT-2023-BLG-0466L b	3.25^{+2.59}_{−2.03}			2.68^{+0.45}_{−0.63}		microlensing	22168^{+3716}_{−5216}	0.44^{+0.36}_{−0.27}		
KMT-2023-BLG-1592L b	0.57^{+0.37}_{−0.29}			2.1±0.6		microlensing	22820^{+3586}_{−7172}	0.59^{+0.33}_{−0.29}		
KMT-2024-BLG-2005L b	0.16^{+0.24}_{−0.09}			1.12^{+0.15}_{−0.15}		microlensing	25179^{+3262}_{−3457}	0.12^{+0.17}_{−0.06}		
KMT-2025-BLG-0121L b	7.77^{+4.08}_{−4.04}			3.05^{+0.46}_{−0.66}		microlensing	20212^{+3032}_{−4400}	0.61±0.32		
KMT-2025-BLG-0481L b	0.59^{+0.85}_{−0.34}			2.18^{+0.31}_{−0.39}		microlensing	26027^{+3686}_{−4697}	0.22^{+0.31}_{−0.13}		
KMT-2025-BLG-1616L b	0.1332^{+0.1278}_{−0.0694}			1.6^{+0.2}_{−0.3}		microlensing	24462^{+2283}_{−3262}	0.26^{+0.25}_{−0.14}		
KOINTREAU-1 b	10.6^{+2.5}_{−2.3}			690±10		imaging	517.27^{+13.79}_{−13.11}	0.26±0.03	3551±59	
KOINTREAU-3 b	3.4±0.7			342±4		imaging	458.646 ^{+6.624}_{−6.442}		3920±70	
KOINTREAU-4 b	11.5^{+1.2}_{−1.6}			182±2		imaging	474.470 ^{+5.688}_{−5.558}			
LHS 1903 b	0.0103±0.0013	0.1233±0.0041	2.1555098^{+0.0000026}_{−0.0000029}	0.02656^{+0.00055}_{−0.00058}	796±20	transit	116.3±0.1	0.538^{+0.039}_{−0.030}	3664±70	
LHS 1903 c	0.01432^{+0.0023}_{−0.0022}	0.1825^{+0.0070}_{−0.0066}	6.226185^{+0.000028}_{−0.000026}	0.05387^{+0.00112}_{−0.00117}	559±14	transit	116.3±0.1	0.538^{+0.039}_{−0.030}	3664±70	
LHS 1903 d	0.01875±0.0036	0.2230^{+0.0070}_{−0.0069}	12.566287^{+0.000032}_{−0.000028}	0.08604^{+0.00178}_{−0.00186}	442±11	transit	116.3±0.1	0.538^{+0.039}_{−0.030}	3664±70	
LHS 1903 e	0.01822^{+0.0050}_{−0.0051}	0.1545^{+0.0053}_{−0.0052}	29.31773^{+0.00028}_{−0.00025}	0.15135^{+0.00314}_{−0.00338}	333^{+9}_{−8}	transit	116.3±0.1	0.538^{+0.039}_{−0.030}	3664±70	
OGLE-2023-BLG-0766L b	1.20^{+0.86}_{−0.60}			2.2±0.5		microlensing	23798^{+2934}_{−3586}	0.45^{+0.32}_{−0.22}		
NGTS-38 b	4.78^{+0.40}_{−0.37}	1.081±0.047	180.52797±0.00036	0.697±0.035	457±11	transit	864	1.46±0.09	6310±129	Planet also known as TIC 65910228 b
NGTS-39 b	1.467±0.081	1.088±0.012	58.204720^{+0.000042}_{−0.000038}	0.3077±0.0055	519^{+6}_{−5}	transit	907.941^{+12.988}_{−12.629}	1.16±0.05	6053^{+67}_{−30}	
TIC 77319217 b		0.27737	7.5483			transit	868.7	1.18±0.05	6126±128	
TIC 86380416 b		0.21519	6.0409			transit	810.2	1.07±0.144	5889±138.4	
TIC 87422071 b	1.29^{+0.10}_{−0.11}	0.969^{+0.087}_{−0.084}	11.364929	0.106±0.005	1,110±33	transit	1302	1.239^{+0.070}_{−0.080}	6150±178	Star also known as TOI-6752.
TIC 117642575 b		0.25221	4.9446			transit	615.9	1.06±0.13	5862±133	
TIC 139702105 b		0.21884	6.836			transit	301.2	0.9±0.11	5265±121	
TIC 147027702 b	1.09^{+0.07}_{−0.13}	0.975^{+0.065}_{−0.064}	44.40523	0.274^{+0.014}_{−0.013}	863^{+26}_{−27}	transit	1490	1.406^{+0.074}_{−0.086}	6410±183	
TIC 161045582 b		0.20038	8.8558			transit	527.9	1.04±0.128	5806±109.5	
TIC 178172313 b		0.25016	4.3732			transit	587.6	0.91±0.11	5300±132	
TIC 198190129 b		0.26077	7.948			transit	452.4	0.638±0.08	4075±118	
TIC 245076932 b	0.51^{+0.04}_{−0.05}	0.970±0.048	21.613890	0.157±0.007	845±25	transit	1026	1.117±0.063	6130±178	
TIC 260969020 b		0.19868	8.4858			transit	394.2	0.75±0.085	4685±128	
TIC 294329732 b		0.1853	9.7566			transit	616.6	0.89±0.11	5215±119	
TIC 423703298 b		0.2473	4.0371			transit	442.8	0.691±0.08	4415±130	
TIC 437041147 b		0.19761	3.823			transit	812.3	0.913±0.11	5374±122	
TOI-237 c		0.1076±0.0031	1.74486147	0.0160^{+0.0005}_{−0.0006}	515^{+11}_{−8}	transit	124.86	0.1698^{+0.0385}_{−0.0350}	3226^{+47}_{−48}	
TOI-375 b	0.745^{+0.052}_{−0.053}	0.961^{+0.044}_{−0.043}	9.45469±0.00002	0.099±0.002	1,373^{+47}_{−45}	transit	1292.163±10.948	1.441^{+0.076}_{−0.075}	5259.9^{+136.9}_{−135.3}	The star is a subgiant.
TOI-375 c	2.106^{+0.223}_{−0.212}		115.5^{+2.0}_{−1.6}	0.524±0.011	596±21	radial vel.	1292.163±10.948	1.441^{+0.076}_{−0.075}	5259.9^{+136.9}_{−135.3}	
TOI-375 d	1.402^{+0.311}_{−0.276}		297.9^{+28.9}_{−18.6}	0.984^{+0.062}_{−0.044}	434±19	radial vel.	1292.163±10.948	1.441^{+0.076}_{−0.075}	5259.9^{+136.9}_{−135.3}	
TOI-791 b	0.02989+^{+0.00516}_{−0.00569}	0.9930±0.0330	139.29931+^{+0.00011}_{−0.00012}	0.602±0.022	434.3±9.7	transit	1097±5	1.28±0.08	6294±128	
TOI-791 c	0.05852^{+0.00705}_{−0.00658}	1.155±0.040	232.01570^{+0.00067}_{−0.00071}	0.863±0.032	362.8±8.2	transit	1097±5	1.28±0.08	6294±128	
TOI-883 b	0.123±0.012	0.604±0.028	10.057716	0.0898±0.0023	1086±19	transit	336	0.956^{+0.054}_{−0.051}	5697±80	
TOI-899 b	0.213±0.024	0.991±0.044	12.846185	0.1063±0.0026	1040±19	transit	1004	0.972^{+0.054}_{−0.053}	5696±80	
TOI-1080 b	0.0055^{+0.0039}_{−0.0018}	0.1071±0.0052	3.9652482	0.0272^{+0.0015}_{−0.0016}	368^{+12}_{−10}	transit	83.36	0.1667±0.0041	3065±50	
TOI-1232 b	0.964±0.06	0.975±0.05	14.256±0.001	0.117±0.001		transit	1071.883^{+7.774}_{−7.666}	1.05±0.133	5818±134.1	
TOI-1232 c	0.18±0.02		30.356±0.01	0.194±0.002		radial vel.	1071.883^{+7.774}_{−7.666}	1.05±0.133	5818±134.1	
TOI-1243 b	0.0242±0.0047	0.2079±0.0107	4.65948	0.1063±0.0026	450	transit	140.6	0.515±0.027	3515±79	
TOI-1533 b	0.0884^{+0.0104}_{−0.0107}	0.258±0.005	3.6457974±0.0000034	0.0445±0.0008		transit	326.32^{+0.98}_{−0.97}	0.88±0.04	5146±81	
TOI-1533 c	0.115^{+0.013}_{−0.012}	>0.67	8.0637926±0.0000052	0.076±0.002		transit	326.32^{+0.98}_{−0.97}	0.88±0.04	5146±81	
TOI-1752 b	0.01284±0.0057	0.1508±0.0062	0.9351861^{+0.0000014}_{−0.0000015}	0.01624±0.00056	1036±31	transit	336.009^{+1.096}_{−1.094}	0.524±0.012	3762±77	
TOI-1752 c	0.0164±0.0069	0.1160±0.0125	32.71443^{+0.00041}_{−0.00035}	0.1614±0.0069	291±17	transit	336.009^{+1.096}_{−1.094}	0.524±0.012	3762±77	
TOI-2040 b	0.781±0.036	0.921±0.023	3.8608576^{+0.0000045}_{−0.0000044}	0.04730±0.00150	1070±29	transit	472.01^{+1.61}_{−1.60}	0.92±0.03	5132±129	
TOI-2049 b	1.53±0.18	1.485^{+0.071}_{−0.067}	5.303468^{+0.000050}_{−0.000048}	0.06919±0.00052	1869±128	transit	1863.96^{+29.92}_{−29.01}	1.57±0.03	6164±202	
TOI-2133 b	0.026^{+0.010}_{−0.008}	0.211±0.008	3.8266472	0.0410±0.0015	798±12	transit	245.3	0.644±0.019	4250±45	
TOI-2147 b	0.365±0.069	0.937±0.027	26.20518±0.00003	0.172±0.006	820±20	transit	920.112^{+8.278}_{−8.134}	0.990±0.040	5983±50	
TOI-2578 b	0.526^{+0.071}_{−0.068}	1.754^{+0.058}_{−0.057}	3.4579667±0.0000033	0.0495^{+0.0022}_{−0.0021}	1778^{+75}_{−74}	transit	931.17^{+11.47}_{−11.20}	1.27±0.09	6333±244	
TOI-3862 b	0.1688^{+0.0087}_{−0.0090}	0.493±0.016	1.55745774	0.02539^{+0.00064}_{−0.00068}	1539	transit	801.2	0.90±0.07	5300±50	
TOI-4336 A c	0.114	0.1039^{+0.0054}_{−0.0052}	7.587270	0.0481±0.0027	378±12	transit	73.23	0.2853^{+0.0438}_{−0.0356}	3369^{+51}_{−57}	
TOI-4427 b	0.276^{+0.039}_{−0.041}	1.168±0.028	4.6182621±0.0000017	0.05389^{+0.00520}_{−0.00350}	1040^{+46}_{−50}	transit	646.52^{+3.03}_{−3.00}	0.90±0.03	5347±135	
TOI-4458 b	1.737±0.095	1.107±0.023	3.9393792±0.0000018	0.0522^{+0.0016}_{−0.0015}	1759^{+30}_{−31}	transit	1648.35^{+16.63}_{−16.31}	1.47±0.04	6151±160	
TOI-4495 b	0.024^{+0.004}_{−0.05}	0.221^{+0.012}_{−0.008}	2.56699	0.03957±0.00047	1735	transit	801.2	1.247±0.045	6210±70	
TOI-4529 b	<0.015	0.158^{+0.008}_{−0.007}	5.879577^{+0.000011}_{−0.000010}	0.04997±0.0008	511^{+34}_{−15}	transit	92.58 ± 0.13	0.482±0.023	3697±71	
TOI-4552 b	0.00576±0.0016	0.099±0.0036	0.30110032±0.00000014	0.0056255±0.0000003	1122	transit	89.3	0.2619±0.0063	3258±115	
TOI-4602 b	0.01948±0.0028	0.2195±0.02025	3.9812997±0.0000050	0.04746±0.00035	1321±78	transit	204.2	0.90±0.02	5966±50	
TOI-4616 b		0.109	1.55382±0.00001		525	transit	91.85±0.08	0.1881±0.0094	3150±75	
TOI-5007 b	0.664^{+0.043}_{−0.042}	0.9880±0.0310	2.543371±0.000001	0.0307±0.0012	774±19	transit	663.26^{+4.05}_{−4.00}	0.632±0.013	3793±80	
TOI-5292 Ab	1.299^{+0.081}_{−0.074}	1.128^{+0.039}_{−0.037}	2.021910±0.000003	0.0279±0.0013	809^{+22}_{−21}	transit	1099.13 ± 26.63	0.596±0.013	3919±80	
TOI-5624 b	0.0296±0.0044	0.20644±0.00312	3.3903473±0.0000054	0.04201^{+0.00041}_{−0.00043}	1136±15	transit	330.7±0.5	0.858^{+0.033}_{−0.029}	5327±64	
TOI-5624 c	0.0151±0.006	0.22072±0.00375	7.885385±0.000018	0.07374^{+0.00072}_{−0.00075}	857±11	transit	330.7±0.5	0.858^{+0.033}_{−0.029}	5327±64	
TOI-5624 d	0.0154±0.0069	0.31975^{+0.00455}_{−0.0045}	13.731468^{+0.000042}_{−0.000041}	0.1067^{+0.0010}_{−0.0011}	712.6^{+9.5}_{−9.4}	transit	330.7±0.5	0.858^{+0.033}_{−0.029}	5327±64	
TOI-5624 e	0.028^{+0.0091}_{−0.009}	0.28968^{+0.00375}_{−0.00384}	21.489936±0.000029	0.1439^{+0.0014}_{−0.0015}	613.8^{+8.2}_{−8.1}	transit	330.7±0.5	0.858^{+0.033}_{−0.029}	5327±64	
TOI-5624 f	0.0409±0.0116		45.37^{+0.74}_{−0.90}	0.2366^{+0.0040}_{−0.0041}	478.5^{+7.1}_{−7.0}	TTV	330.7±0.5	0.858^{+0.033}_{−0.029}	5327±64	
TOI-5734 b	0.0286±0.0082	0.187±0.011	6.1841876^{+0.0000080}_{−0.0000094}	0.05921±0.00024	688±23	transit	106.034^{+0.255}_{−0.254}	0.724±0.009	4750±100	
TOI-5628 Ab	0.090±0.040	0.74±0.04	4.3416612±0.0000015	0.0368±0.0210	492±15	transit	358.87^{+2.987}_{−2.937}	0.36±0.02	3310±100	
TOI-5788 b	0.0117±0.0030	0.1365±0.0067	6.340758	0.0640±0.0011		transit	317.6 ± 0.4	0.87±0.04	5615±25	
TOI-5788 c	0.0201±0.0038	0.2025±0.0036	16.213358	0.1197±0.0020		transit	317.6 ± 0.4	0.87±0.04	5615±25	
TOI-5789 b	0.00667±0.00088		2.76369±0.00096	0.03608±0.00045	1201±26	radial vel.	66.726^{+0.124}_{−0.123}	0.821^{+0.032}_{−0.027}	5185±80	
TOI-5789 c	0.0157±0.0016	0.255^{+0.016}_{−0.013}	12.927748±0.000016	0.1009±0.0013	718±15	transit	66.726^{+0.124}_{−0.123}	0.821^{+0.032}_{−0.027}	5185±80	
TOI-5789 d	0.0135±0.0021		29.65±0.12	0.1756±0.0023	545±10	radial vel.	66.726^{+0.124}_{−0.123}	0.821^{+0.032}_{−0.027}	5185±80	
TOI-5789 e	0.03653±0.00305		62.98±0.22	0.2901±0.0037	424±8	radial vel.	66.726^{+0.124}_{−0.123}	0.821^{+0.032}_{−0.027}	5185±80	
TOI-5916 b	0.713^{+0.241}_{−0.114}	1.013^{+0.032}_{−0.033}	2.367128±0.000001	0.0262^{+0.0021}_{−0.0029}	683^{+43}_{−29}	transit	651.43^{+11.10}_{−10.75}	0.477±0.011	3613±80	
TOI-5938 b	0.049^{+0.025}_{−0.022}	0.341±0.010	2.2604240	0.0308±0.0010	1077^{+16}_{−15}	transit	371.9	0.744±0.016	4650±50	
TOI-6692 b	0.620^{+0.080}_{−0.065}	1.042^{+0.050}_{−0.049}	131.125±0.012	0.512^{+0.014}_{−0.012}	467.0^{+9.3}_{−9.5}	transit	1013	1.047^{+0.089}_{−0.071}	5890^{+170}_{−180}	
TOI-6019 b	0.469±0.047	1.10±0.03	14.547952^{+0.000036}_{−0.000035}	0.1212±0.0033	1095±30	transit	849.047^{+7.718}_{−7.581}	1.13±0.04	5561±70	
TOI-6716 b	0.00287	0.0874±0.0062	4.71859	0.032±0.003	369	transit	61.6	0.223±0.011	3110±80	
TOI-7009 b	0.047^{+0.023}_{−0.021}	0.331±0.013	2.3206612	0.0287±0.0010	872^{+11}_{−10}	transit	600.5	0.583±0.014	4080±25	
TOI-7169 b	0.41±0.14	1.475±0.029	3.4373125^{+0.0000020}_{−0.0000019}	0.04280^{+0.00016}_{−0.00017}	1631^{+19}_{−20}	transit	1524.303^{+22.931}_{−22.274}	0.885±0.01	5714±42	Orbits a metal-poor star.
TOI-7384 b	0.039	0.3176±0.0187	6.23403	0.0439±0.004	378	transit	218	0.318±0.016	3185±75	
WISPIT 2 c	10±2	1.6^{+0.6}_{−0.7}		14	2050±550	imaging	437 ± 1	1.08^{+0.06}_{−0.17}	4400±50	
TOI-201 d	0.018±0.006	0.124±0.006	5.84889±0.00009	0.0698±0.0005		transit	365.9 ± 0.6	1.32^{+0.02}_{−0.04}	6423^{+86}_{−90}	
TOI-159 b	3.49±0.26	1.622±0.015	3.7628396±0.0000003	0.0560±0.0007	1891±23	transit	1133.688^{+8.275}_{−8.157}	1.661^{+0.017}_{−0.019}	7287^{+69}_{−73}	
TIC 183374187 b	0.56±0.19	1.252±0.070	5.05907±0.00059		1379±23	transit	3952.89^{+150.23}_{−139.82}	0.853±0.048	5768±58	
TOI-4311 b	0.014^{+0.005}_{−0.004}	0.1228^{+0.0069}_{−0.0071}	0.9902738^{+0.0000029}_{−0.0000030}	0.01817^{+0.00036}_{−0.00037}	1664±28	transit	440.311^{+3.04}_{−3.00}	0.816^{+0.047}_{−0.049}	5063±66	
TOI-4311 c	<0.04273	0.220^{+0.011}_{−0.010}	15.070425^{+0.000081}_{−0.000075}	0.1116^{+0.0022}_{−0.0023}	671±11	transit	440.311^{+3.04}_{−3.00}	0.816^{+0.047}_{−0.049}	5063±66	
TOI-3457 b	<2.51	0.949±0.022	32.600268^{+0.000028}_{−0.000030}	0.2001±0.0064	824.2^{+10.3}_{−9.9}	transit	1209.118^{+10.033}_{−9.873}	1.04±0.06	6300±120	
TOI-707 b		0.2155±0.0087	52.79918^{+0.00021}_{−0.00016}	0.275±0.010	491.7^{+7.9}_{−7.4}	transit	427.142^{+1.357}_{−1.347}	0.990±0.060	5424±61	
TOI-3664 b	0.36±0.12	1.222±0.030	3.2974839±0.0000041	0.0431±0.0010	1232±12	transit	1516.122^{+15.885}_{−15.566}	0.980±0.030	5593±32	
TOI-4034 b	0.870±0.160	1.580±0.020	1.8020932±0.0000012	0.03289±0.00071	1907±22	transit	2431.015^{+29.237}_{−28.561}	1.19^{+0.13}_{−0.03}	5891±40	
TOI-6564 b	0.699±0.066	1.463±0.019	3.985413±0.000011	0.0542±0.0012	1445±21	transit	624.237^{+4.534}_{−4.472}	1.18^{+0.16}_{−0.03}	5943±64	
HD 190360 d	0.0322±0.0025		88.690^{+0.051}_{−0.049}	0.3886±0.0046		radial vel.	52.2 ± 0.3	0.9960^{+0.0360}_{−0.0350}	5560±100	Star also known as Gliese 777
HD 127195 b	0.67±0.02		534.50^{+2.85}_{−2.92}			radial vel.	276.307 ± 1.871	1.34±0.06	4981±26	
HD 127195 c	0.65±0.02		836.99^{+9.35}_{−9.67}			radial vel.	276.307 ± 1.871	1.34±0.06	4981±26	
HD 125136 b	2.26±0.08		849.77^{+4.61}_{−4.73}			radial vel.	395.488 ± 1.438	1.55±0.08	4959±34	
HD 126105 b	1.67^{+0.19}_{−0.17}		524.0±2.9	1.36^{+0.05}_{−0.06}		radial vel.	270.329^{+1.079}_{−1.071}	1.20^{+0.14}_{−0.21}	4875^{+45}_{−40}	
TIC 150070085 b		0.323^{+0.019}_{−0.018}	10.474230^{+0.000045}_{−0.000044}		945.06^{+62.73}_{−42.89}	transit	666.729^{+7.573}_{−7.407}	1.16±0.06	5999±50	
Gl 725 B c	0.011±0.002		37.90±0.17	0.139±0.004	215±4	radial vel.	11.491 ± 0.001	0.25±0.02	3379±31	
HIP 81991 b	9.50^{+5.40}_{−2.20}		5860±603	6.4^{+0.6}_{−0.3}		radial vel.	143.189 ± 0.233	1.09^{+0.07}_{−0.13}	5100^{+40}_{−70}	
MOA-2020-BLG-108L b	10.67^{+4.75}_{−5.41}			3.69^{+0.98}_{−1.11}		microlensing	15492^{+4631}_{−5871}	0.58^{+0.26}_{−0.30}		
TOI-603 b	0.104^{+0.020}_{−0.020}	0.658±0.021	16.179846^{+0.000019}_{−0.000017}	0.1282^{+0.0046}_{−0.0049}	899±17	transit	671.706^{+5.192}_{−5.117}	1.240±0.092	6027±93	
TOI-2114 b	1.02^{+0.15}_{−0.14}	1.298±0.060	6.2099590^{+0.0000045}_{−0.0000047}	0.0760^{+0.0050}_{−0.0049}	1472^{+57}_{−55}	transit	1036.800^{+8.043}_{−7.918}	1.309±0.052	6400±170	
TOI-4492 b	5.92^{+0.67}_{−0.64}	1.051±0.055	4.4331824^{+0.0000015}_{−0.0000014}	0.0535^{+0.0029}_{−0.0030}	1207±34	transit	467.047^{+2.939}_{−2.900}	1.067±0.055	5711±83	
TOI-5806 b	2.27^{+0.26}_{−0.25}	1.35^{+0.17}_{−0.11}	3.1856381±0.0000010	0.0484±0.0025	1621^{+56}_{−52}	transit	388.814^{+2.711}_{−2.679}	1.333±0.099	6730±190	
TOI-5811 B b	0.81^{+0.11}_{−0.10}	1.96±0.18	6.25663±0.00012	0.0731^{+0.0048}_{−0.0047}	1530^{+50}_{−54}	transit	554.998^{+4.980}_{−4.896}	1.08±0.32	4840±110	
TOI-6158 b	0.425^{+0.060}_{−0.058}	0.930^{+0.240}_{−0.100}	3.04468990^{+0.00000551}_{−0.00000534}	0.03275±0.00040	636±13	transit	590.679^{+12.068}_{−11.602}	0.503^{+0.022}_{−0.023}	3467±59	
TOI-7189 b	0.50±0.09	0.980±0.050	2.89055000^{+0.00000612}_{−0.00000610}	0.03294^{+0.00037}_{−0.00038}	738±32	transit	626.601^{+5.255}_{−5.171}	0.612^{+0.024}_{−0.023}	3775±59	
TOI-7265 B b	0.71±0.09	0.95±0.04	4.17232000^{+0.00000256}_{−0.00000257}	0.04007^{+0.00052}_{−0.00054}	571±27	transit	469.624^{+3.451}_{−3.400}	0.521±0.023	3503±59	
TOI-7393 b	0.61±0.07	1.01±0.06	3.33708000^{+0.00000095}_{−0.00000094}	0.03664±0.00041	747±32	transit	616.561 ± 2.101	0.600±0.021	3927±59	
TOI-7394 B b	2.10^{+0.13}_{−0.15}	1.02±0.06	1.25299500±0.00000031	0.01913±0.00021	986.0±42.0	transit	619.682^{+3.131}_{−3.102}	0.624±0.022	3717±59	
TOI-2195 A b	0.079±0.017	0.793+0.024 −0.022	4.16451307±0.00000054	0.04901+0.00065 −0.00052	1,098 ± 10	transit	174.67±0.3	0.905+0.036 −0.028	5266+72 −76	
CD-35 2722 B b	0.92^{+0.01}_{−0.05}		171.11^{+0.53}_{−0.36}	0.200^{+0.001}_{−0.004}		radial vel.	72.93 ± 0.02	0.035		
KMT-2025-BLG-0975L b	0.09376^{+0.15876}_{−0.05047}			0.81^{+0.10}_{−0.11}		microlensing	25552^{+3131}_{−3425}	0.10^{+0.18}_{−0.06}		
KMT-2025-BLG-1160L b	0.07979^{+0.04864}_{−0.04443}			2.56^{+0.48}_{−0.71}		microlensing	19472^{+3979}_{−5969}	0.58^{+0.35}_{−0.32}		
TOI-3053 b	0.85±0.12	1.21±0.03	2.9919987^{+0.0000013}_{−0.0000012}	0.039±0.001	1290±28	transit	1101.299^{+7.169}_{−7.078}	0.960^{+0.080}_{−0.030}	5378^{+82}_{−90}	
TOI-4409 b	0.047^{+0.016}_{−0.017}	0.664±0.017	92.491789^{+0.000101}_{−0.000098}			transit	585.201^{+2.407}_{−2.390}	0.763^{+0.026}_{−0.025}	4928^{+47}_{−50}	
TOI-3278 b	0.30±0.07	1.24±0.04	3.2464560^{+0.0000045}_{−0.0000044}	0.043±0.002	1561±35	transit	2953.291^{+61.096}_{−58.708}	1.04^{+0.09}_{−0.10}	5720^{+89}_{−91}	
TIC 153919886 b		0.2414145539702196	2.105104923293050			transit	431.599 ± 1.112		4137.1646	
TIC 154870955 b		0.2760888563001960	7.969874712803670			transit	738.637^{+2.257}_{−2.244}		4739.579	
TIC 160113658 b		0.31137155760185670	6.729522620768060			transit	652.837^{+2.749}_{−2.731}		4817.3125	
TIC 188624430 b		0.3254638872898755	6.218604331321840			transit	980.957^{+5.724}_{−5.659}		5369.4634	
TIC 18942729 b		0.1784473721008717	0.9981783806425880			transit	375.651^{+2.028}_{−2.009}		4360.111	
TIC 206466666 b		0.1916478211765955	9.104868651593060			transit	416.956^{+1.138}_{−1.132}		4620.303	
TIC 231949697 b		0.1363476834339067	0.907204487193626			transit	163.866 ± 0.203		3451.3208	
TIC 24750448 b		0.21743478553700518	3.5915919302927097			transit	581.041^{+1.432}_{−1.422}		4545.429	
TIC 24750448 c		0.27569703321836747	10.143852707262800			transit	581.041^{+1.432}_{−1.422}		4545.429	
TIC 249022743 b		0.4278427880155490	2.2571968153789799			transit	1293.556^{+18.172}_{−17.688}		5567.5835	
TIC 270471727 b		0.2453653600732661	10.4562325664747			transit	593.964^{+2.224}_{−2.208}		5271.394	
TIC 290487717 b		0.5921840343154057	3.4008182289958699			transit	1290.377^{+11.389}_{−11.194}		5328.965	
TIC 32032563 b		0.3102333313397587	13.834604877911699			transit	1656.530^{+10.679}_{−10.544}		5567.9287	
TIC 320419023 b		0.2473737536215563	5.263756515893130			transit	942.445^{+9.909}_{−9.710}		5703.365	
TIC 34085383 b		0.3497037839152065	3.477933685226790			transit	486.407^{+3.007}_{−2.968}		4694.8403	
TIC 349520724 b		0.2521427421270946	7.940446350207950			transit	786.423^{+4.279}_{−4.230}		5098.6045	
TIC 356227008 b		0.21324330531428518	2.9614744870222403			transit	1264.381^{+10.310}_{−10.144}		5731.8594	
TIC 38825265 b		0.1952626044462188	3.313369809852010			transit	540.242^{+1.435}_{−1.430}		4375.5215	
TIC 38828280 b		0.2343670989440048	4.855589847618950			transit	934.203^{+4.517}_{−4.475}		5046.6274	
TIC 390586021 b		0.2551609251127215	2.7470375581861401			transit	373.649^{+1.696}_{−1.686}		4434.8135	
TIC 445839811 b		0.2210470495257361	11.108626031801400			transit	768.664^{+4.719}_{−4.660}		5408.2505	
TIC 62895484 b		0.31170690356365055	2.8398543432660501			transit	962.024^{+13.010}_{−12.671}		5520.7876	
TIC 65612701 b		0.45303209763831070	10.22467974953430			transit	494.548^{+2.231}_{−2.211}		5692.2856	
TIC 67686059 b		0.23117706159020779	3.5216352955124002			transit	812.885^{+6.115}_{−6.025}		5090.089	
TIC 77319217 b		0.27734861419182832	7.548307651235870			transit	872.931^{+6.050}_{−5.972}		5961.52	
TIC 77552382 b		0.5077858588824531	3.510259049424970			transit	1218.314^{+16.034}_{−15.629}		4981.0693	
TIC 86380416 b		0.21521682193530764	6.040864346099060			transit	798.103^{+5.806}_{−5.727}		5723.7373	
TIC 88692598 b		0.16174169265501814	2.64909436758173			transit	239.814^{+0.420}_{−0.419}		3483.169	
TOI-1036 b		0.5607107458972795	3.779521254959044			transit	600.201^{+3.155}_{−3.122}		5664.6846	
TOI-1105 b		0.27283806273991518	10.868184109325735			transit	259.372^{+0.604}_{−0.601}		4678.4644	
TOI-1226 b		0.21501608979421125	3.9288088157570940			transit	841.295 ^{+3.865}_{−3.833}		5434.915	
TOI-205 b		0.22314352140237995	4.2530077381516840			transit	579.806^{+3.010}_{−2.981}		6302.739	
TOI-1269 c		0.19894686951822857	9.237861441954641			transit	561.452^{+2.270}_{−2.250}		5554.02	
TOI-1291 b		0.5030130803012459	7.162009755104158			transit	1396.666^{+14.980}_{−14.673}		6139.9536	
TOI-1466 b		0.2201288388504460	1.8719060223080493			transit	282.385^{+0.550}_{−0.548}		4435.388	
TOI-1718 b		0.36651414191726545	5.587037686152569			transit	170.597^{+0.306}_{−0.305}		5304.907	
TOI-1722 b		0.3910240542809408	9.60523206942869			transit	444.976^{+2.763}_{−2.728}		5999.5493	
TOI-1732 b		0.22263379150163357	4.1192367833901260			transit	243.838 ± 0.755		4201.93	
TOI-1750 b		0.2488574510596934	11.337271296555633			transit	529.901^{+2.749}_{−2.720}		4683.7505	
TOI-1756 b		0.17327682935318484	2.7830173629710577			transit	282.825 ± 0.363		3891.8628	
TOI-1814 b		0.4626082026492814	6.368610104615931			transit	1182.576^{+10.662}_{−10.477}		4872.8413	
TOI-1839 b	0.0223±0.0025	0.203±0.009	1.4237828±0.0000045	0.02355±0.00009	1585±33	transit	378.631^{+1.849}_{−1.836}	0.86±0.01	5347±67	
TOI-1839 c	0.019±0.003	0.223±0.012	4.0239478^{+0.0000036}_{−0.0000034}	0.04708±0.00018	1121±24	transit	378.631^{+1.849}_{−1.836}	0.86±0.01	5347±67	
TOI-1873 b		0.2554705055746280	7.005727088337687			transit	593.675^{+2.639}_{−2.613}		5597.9927	
TOI-2071 b		0.2288202668143818	5.6739538698194076			transit	754.457^{+3.350}_{−3.324}		5755.4136	
TOI-209 b		0.2136430566020517	4.3794358744487454			transit	369.831^{+0.894}_{−0.884}		4806.664	
TOI-2092 b		0.2630863312179627	4.3032552807415971			transit	576.549^{+3.308}_{−3.268}		5842.0635	
TOI-2104 b		0.1364068071238981	5.6739538698194076			transit	250.301^{+0.416}_{−0.415}		4856.127	
TOI-2200 b		0.6212077046653839	2.9360283651249377			transit	819.488^{+3.894}_{−3.858}		5036.169	
TOI-2227 b		0.2764615225634262	4.2217581564829354			transit	539.613^{+2.100}_{−2.085}		5889.542	
TOI-2453 b		0.28939325468071647	4.4414346318830669			transit	267.148^{+1.000}_{−0.993}		3720.2297	
TOI-2518 b		0.2023722596404356	6.897974252162044			transit	524.566^{+2.374}_{−2.352}		5751.197	
TOI-2654 b		0.70876575246063134	2.9676042592600820			transit	812.039^{+3.568}_{−3.539}		4594.0825	
TOI-3896 b		0.2809793728619411	4.3773036966683501			transit	592.496^{+2.335}_{−2.317}		5110.907	
TOI-4029 b		0.6010864284773240	5.884982346308743			transit	895.351^{+10.920}_{−10.663}		5662.527	
TOI-4030 b		0.5215689146304533	2.5090019946110167			transit	1864.568^{+14.624}_{−14.405}		5640.3687	
TOI-4156 b		0.2264468389483801	4.4618903413325341			transit	697.090^{+3.268}_{−3.235}		5971.6445	
TOI-4156 c		0.26077639866840291	12.822827063747477			transit	697.090^{+3.268}_{−3.235}		5971.6445	
TOI-4363 b		0.15763188294055752	2.1186759227871521			transit	253.672^{+0.705}_{−0.701}		4278.4517	
TOI-4405 b		0.22794707909825249	5.9214399531586563			transit	507.183^{+1.011}_{−1.005}		4467.3813	
TOI-4511 b		0.24561103187857949	10.9809096859598			transit	397.384 ^{+2.322}_{−2.300}		5418.774	
TOI-4513 b		0.2092854063782501	9.760422536841604			transit	334.671^{+1.511}_{−1.500}		5623.926	
TOI-4561 b		0.15861318569266913	8.935479367055972			transit	583.868^{+1.834}_{−1.824}		5537.932	
TOI-4578 b		0.20249322191201116	8.623926303692247			transit	594.427^{+2.446}_{−2.427}		5951.324	
TOI-4588 b		0.2613284522691758	13.11881173650605			transit	734.503^{+4.762}_{−4.701}		7746.1177	
TOI-4640 b		0.2536595652839203	2.685660152375885			transit	799.498^{+7.136}_{−7.012}		5743.01	
TOI-4662 b		0.25693531485564630	4.703437645745288			transit	362.185^{+0.943}_{−0.939}		4520.415	
TOI-4747 b		0.35311257229130905	5.219241585923660			transit	993.620^{+6.614}_{−6.530}		5595.083	
TOI-4898 b		0.3318584891629616	2.765204701665652			transit	321.577 ± 1.287		4201.575	
TOI-4930 b		0.6185015781649372	6.781302414982157			transit	1375.907^{+148.297}_{−121.900}		5624.7163	
TOI-5159 b		0.1380429820203651	5.836394288431453			transit	179.973^{+0.598}_{−0.594}		5156.1587	
TOI-5160 b		0.2138730165492566	4.2807732559996055			transit	494.054 ^{+3.399}_{−3.354}		5622.1416	
TOI-5335 b		0.3590176242905553	3.613659884426799			transit	1080.892^{+14.624}_{−14.243}		5528.9194	
TOI-5380 b		0.31054852118606385	3.7722924787303649			transit	935.603^{+11.387}_{−11.123}		6400.784	
TOI-5486 b		0.3540240981374904	2.0247007320474704			transit	292.503 ^{+0.875}_{−0.870}		3750.1694	
TOI-5502 b		0.3683419489658655	11.625929882847782			transit	811.733 ^{+17.674}_{−16.949}		6088.708	
TOI-5515 b		0.2367412065516435	8.592258108389593			transit	441.852^{+3.033}_{−2.991}		5483.6465	
TOI-5532 b		0.22550105114121233	5.653965943099285			transit	296.795 ± 1.065		4208.4453	
TOI-5595 b		0.4226436055664871	5.9900255385328087			transit	446.705^{+2.094}_{−2.077}		4417.3	
TOI-5599 b		0.6413447745164624	5.4369150394056547			transit	1787.629^{+20.705}_{−20.243}		6137.022	
TOI-5605 b		0.22536509729086229	5.9134045484272102			transit	310.092^{+0.839}_{−0.834}		4583.794	
TOI-5614 b		0.2870549295349631	4.1722132894941160			transit	727.396^{+2.586}_{−2.567}		4553.0015	
TOI-5630 b		0.2115424758315098	3.2211845253634936			transit	437.211^{+1.168}_{−1.161}		5385.638	
TOI-5777 b		0.2761636241060525	6.9171617737339268			transit	372.737^{+0.946}_{−0.936}		4408.0264	
TOI-5926 b		0.6751792766994926	3.811227942366071			transit	897.444^{+9.068}_{−8.889}		5388.918	
TOI-6080 b		0.2965694892539044	8.055623480837127			transit	613.787 ^{+2.633}_{−2.609}		5775.461	
TOI-6281 b		0.17166241887250167	1.0542624417690454			transit	188.338 ^{+0.365}_{−0.363}		4533.2285	
TOI-6393 b		0.2461941446613069	9.531761103285383			transit	607.442 ^{+3.457}_{−3.419}		5008.2036	
TOI-6677 b		0.5205710738359506	5.450606616254479			transit	1111.708 ^{+25.113}_{−24.044}		6572.281	
TOI-6699 b		0.2075525618090081	5.320059267613263			transit	280.011 ^{+1.323}_{−1.311}		4705.099	
TOI-6707 b		0.5109055690594005	3.834793637582070			transit	2092.658 ^{+22.167}_{−21.718}		6289.4937	
TOI-6954 b		0.3243153823166401	4.0207412741901170			transit	619.923 ^{+5.404}_{−5.316}		5170.8706	
TOI-697 b		0.2104199927248040	8.607887135928124			transit	305.844 ^{+0.697}_{−0.694}		5681.948	
TOI-7008 b		0.4413740103841675	0.84069041367335029			transit	1338.831 ^{+6.857}_{−6.791}		5116.061	
TOI-7155 b		0.2148468981197630	3.8948971198137330			transit	472.116 ^{+1.386}_{−1.381}		4673.0273	
TOI-7333 b		0.18687641780951542	6.2644980366099654			transit	512.783 ^{+1.863}_{−1.846}		4586.8726	
TOI-799 b		0.18434484789904459	5.5451913967641087			transit	517.048 ^{+1.670}_{−1.663}		5662.8096	
TOI-808 b		0.1965784113277727	9.739448540261758			transit	320.245 ^{+0.918}_{−0.912}		5078.196	
TOI-883 b		0.6398139559739604	10.057718485379370			transit	334.777 ^{+1.873}_{−1.853}		5713.155	
TOI-921 b		0.31529148519636940	5.128719076282650			transit	959.044 ^{+6.632}_{−6.543}		6011.662	
TOI-929 b		0.23997127895735723	5.8301536694404721			transit	373.195 ^{+0.959}_{−0.956}		4457.1562	
TOI-938 b		0.4303705925974504	8.807338822109248			transit	701.449 ^{+6.282}_{−6.170}		5829.4185	
TOI-941 b		0.5809317853835331	8.514608887869771			transit	859.991 ^{+20.776}_{−19.833}		5745.8794	
KMT-2024-BLG-0176L b	0.76^{+1.03}_{−0.39}			0.75^{+0.09}_{−0.10} or 1.32^{+0.16}_{−0.18}		microlensing	27201^{+3294}_{−3686}	0.103^{+0.141}_{−0.054}		
KMT-2024-BLG-0349L b	11.86^{+6.56}_{−6.54}			1.85^{+0.65}_{−0.77} or 6.46^{+2.27}_{−2.69}		microlensing	18754^{+6588}_{−7795}	0.68±0.38		
KMT-2024-BLG-1870L b	1.06^{+0.53}_{−0.55}			2.57^{+0.64}_{−0.97} or 3.15^{+0.79}_{−1.19}		microlensing	17873^{+4468}_{−6719}	0.67^{+0.33}_{−0.34}		
KMT-2024-BLG-2087L b	4.39^{+3.07}_{−2.46}			3.03^{+0.42}_{−0.54}		microlensing	23451^{+3098}_{−4175}	0.48^{+0.27}_{−0.33}		
TOI-2431 b	0.020±0.005	0.1369^{+0.0030}_{−0.0029}	0.22419578±0.00000005	0.0063±0.0001	2,063±30	transit	117.600 ^{+0.193}_{−0.194}	0.661^{+0.021}_{−0.024}	4,109^{+28}_{−27}	
TOI-5349 b	0.40±0.02	0.91±0.02	3.317921±0.000002	0.0369±0.0004	719±15	transit	614.456 ^{+6.933}_{−6.777}	0.61±0.02	3751±59	
HD 715 b	0.635±0.056	1.07±0.04	56.40^{+0.19}_{−0.23}	0.336±0.003	798^{+13}_{−12}	transit	545.616 ^{+5.241}_{−5.147}	1.60±0.04	6070±50	
HD 278555 b	0.84±0.10	0.984^{+0.036}_{−0.035}	28.842438^{+0.000045}_{−0.000046}	0.1985^{+0.0039}_{−0.0040}	853±16	transit	945.956 ^{+17.924}_{−17.282}	1.255^{+0.075}_{−0.073}	6047^{+93}_{−95}	
KMT-2025-BLG-0026L b	2.13^{+5.23}_{−1.26}			0.960^{+0.150}_{−0.200}		microlensing	22342 ^{+3588}_{−4990}	0.44^{+1.08}_{−0.26}		
KMT-2025-BLG-0030L b	1.15^{+0.69}_{−0.66}			2.35^{+0.44}_{−0.76}		microlensing	18982 ^{+4110}_{−7045}	0.60^{+0.36}_{−0.34}		
KMT-2025-BLG-2272L b	2.47^{+1.23}_{−1.25}			1.15^{+0.69}_{−0.66}		microlensing	20222 ^{+2935}_{−4305}	0.63^{+0.31}_{−0.32}		
OGLE-2016-BLG-0261L b	0.21^{+0.34}_{−0.12}			0.72^{+0.09}_{−0.10}		microlensing	25277 ^{+3164}_{−3490}	0.072^{+0.117}_{−0.040}		
TOI-426 b	0.021±0.006	0.195±0.008	1.32050258^{+0.00000075}_{−0.00000084}	0.02374±0.00088	1790^{+28}_{−27}	transit	370.501 ^{+1.393}_{−1.381}	1.00±0.02	5750±62	
TOI-426 c	1.40^{+0.06}_{−0.05}		235.8^{+9.2}_{−8.5}	0.747±0.019	319.2±7.2	radial vel.	370.501 ^{+1.393}_{−1.381}	1.00±0.02	5750±62	
K2-232 c	5.31^{+0.48}_{−0.45}		1950^{+140}_{−120}	3.17^{+0.16}_{−0.14}		radial vel.	426.427 ^{+2.505}_{−2.476}	1.121^{+0.063}_{−0.065}	6100±100	
KMT-2023-BLG-1118L b	0.21^{+0.31}_{−0.12}			0.9^{+0.2}_{−0.1}		microlensing	23809 ^{+2283}_{−1957}	0.09^{+0.12}_{−0.04}		
KMT-2023-BLG-1810L b	7.24^{+4.34}_{−3.56}			3.4^{+0.8}_{−0.9}		microlensing	20222 ^{+2609}_{−5219}	0.56^{+0.32}_{−0.25}		
KMT-2023-BLG-0084L b	2.50^{+1.50}_{−0.95}			2.5^{+0.7}_{−0.5}		microlensing	17939 ^{+7502}_{−2609}	0.20^{+0.06}_{−0.05}		
HD 148797 b	0.124^{+0.041}_{−0.027}	0.736±0.033	42.0988331	0.2568±0.0052	762±17	transit	562.254 ^{+3.977}_{−3.923}	1.272±0.079	6441±50	
HD 148797 c	0.125±0.029	0.746±0.034	68.1514539	0.3536±0.0072	650±15	transit	562.254 ^{+3.977}_{−3.923}	1.272±0.079	6441±50	
TOI-4468 b	0.5352^{+0.0305}_{−0.0277}	1.007^{+0.028}_{−0.025}	2.77085931±0.00000036	0.03592^{+0.00060}_{−0.00057}	1153^{+26}_{−22}	transit	1224.951 ^{+8.477}_{−8.363}	0.805^{+0.042}_{−0.038}	5170^{+120}_{−110}	
TOI-4468 c		0.276^{+0.012}_{−0.011}	7.013900±0.000020	0.0667±0.0011	846^{+19}_{−16}	transit	1224.951 ^{+8.477}_{−8.363}	0.805^{+0.042}_{−0.038}	5170^{+120}_{−110}	
TOI-5646 b	0.1445^{+0.0140}_{−0.0139}	0.590±0.025	2.4277027±0.0000025	0.0427±0.0019	1935^{+29}_{−28}	transit	1401.344 ^{+32.123}_{−30.737}	1.418^{+0.068}_{−0.079}	6136±51	
TOI-789 b	<0.012	0.105±0.004	5.4470340±0.0000050	0.043±0.001	448±11	transit	141.572±0.189	0.358±0.009	3471±64	
TOI-789 c	<0.0094	0.103±0.004	8.0432344±0.0000123	0.056±0.002	394±9	transit	141.572±0.189	0.358±0.009	3471±64	
TOI-789 d	<0.021	0.125±0.005	12.9706890±0.0000153	0.077±0.002	336±8	transit	141.572±0.189	0.358±0.009	3471±64	
TOI-1154 b		0.244±0.012	21.745490^{+0.000017}_{−0.000016}			transit	306.203 ^{+0.872}_{−0.868}	1.020000^{+0.155310}_{−0.100873}	5704.000^{+134.934}_{−119.856}	
TOI-1245 b		0.210^{+0.008}_{−0.007}	4.8204406^{+0.0000036}_{−0.0000038}			transit	261.247 ^{+0.388}_{−0.387}	0.5217920±0.0202308	3692±157	
TOI-1262 b		0.213±0.013	20.877835^{+0.000057}_{−0.000076}			transit	304.053 ^{+0.593}_{−0.591}	0.94000000^{+0.16673200}_{−0.06534770}	5396.000^{+116.569}_{−127.411}	
TOI-1281 b		0.239±0.012	6.390997^{+0.000012}_{−0.000011}			transit	581.386 ^{+2.182}_{−2.169}	1.190000^{+0.216472}_{−0.120980}	6191.000^{+134.367}_{−120.556}	
TOI-1432 b		0.213±0.012	6.1094927^{+0.0000064}_{−0.0000067}			transit	310.433 ^{+1.298}_{−1.287}	0.9900000^{+0.1048710}_{−0.1571960}	5587.000^{+135.301}_{−117.548}	
TOI-1435 b		0.0964±0.0080	0.6858239^{+0.0002692}_{−0.0000012}			transit	302.871 ^{+0.622}_{−0.620}	0.870000^{+0.104055}_{−0.112362}	5142.000^{+124.503}_{−120.920}	
TOI-1441 b		0.252^{+0.014}_{−0.013}	22.092958^{+0.000143}_{−0.000049}			transit	460.337 ^{+2.433}_{−2.410}	1.067000^{+0.180357}_{−0.137097}	5885.000^{+231.857}_{−171.353}	
TOI-1806 c		0.118^{+0.014}_{−0.013}	0.5018934^{+0.0000025}_{−0.0000031}			transit	181.084 ^{+0.654}_{−0.650}	0.3932580±0.0202403	3272±157	
TOI-1806 d		0.257^{+0.022}_{−0.021}	8.196064^{+0.000050}_{−0.000044}			transit	181.084 ^{+0.654}_{−0.650}	0.3932580±0.0202403	3272±157	
TOI-213 b		0.232±0.018	23.519904^{+0.000013}_{−0.000011}			transit	177.201±0.188	0.7200000^{+0.0861796}_{−0.0763526}	4566.400^{+120.046}_{−123.527}	
TOI-2238 b		0.232±0.014	3.390463^{+0.000015}_{−0.000012}			transit	932.250 ^{+6.804}_{−6.706}	1.150000^{+0.176014}_{−0.130831}	6113.800^{+120.597}_{−94.133}	
TOI-2245 b		0.436±0.022	3.7980908^{+0.0000052}_{−0.0000053}			transit	863.871 ^{+5.515}_{−5.450}	1.080000^{+0.131756}_{−0.123531}	5918.000^{+120.583}_{−144.973}	
TOI-2287 b		0.161±0.011	11.812041^{+0.000039}_{−0.000043}			transit	309.735 ^{+0.616}_{−0.614}	1.120000^{+0.155332}_{−0.120176}	6037.000^{+138.037}_{−105.188}	
TOI-2293 b		0.186±0.009	6.068314^{+0.000017}_{−0.000016}			transit	204.687 ^{+0.419}_{−0.417}	0.4974390±0.0203219	3668±157	
TOI-2392 b		0.211±0.015	9.169362^{+0.000064}_{−0.000065}			transit	1062.106 ^{+7.221}_{−7.123}	1.210000^{+0.166070}_{−0.199232}	6244.500^{+131.824}_{−135.967}	
TOI-2426 b		0.211±0.018	4.0812^{+0.0011}_{−0.0012}			transit	451.097 ^{+2.420}_{−2.397}	1.019000^{+0.139340}_{−0.116833}	5716.000^{+152.321}_{−104.423}	
TOI-2441 b		0.244±0.012	12.890155±0.000015			transit	275.684 ^{+0.624}_{−0.621}	0.4652350±0.0203602	3478±157	
TOI-248 b		0.211±0.011	5.9910723±0.0000031			transit	247.716 ^{+0.460}_{−0.459}	1.020000^{+0.112881}_{−0.124244}	5711.700^{+123.838}_{−108.271}	
TOI-2540 b		0.204^{+0.023}_{−0.022}	12.718739^{+0.000029}_{−0.000031}			transit	62.434±0.036	0.6300000^{+0.0870424}_{−0.0799322}	4023.000^{+166.681}_{−83.389}	
TOI-3585 b		0.380±0.029	3.5410696^{+0.0000051}_{−0.0000052}			transit	426.682 ^{+1.970}_{−1.954}	0.7400000^{+0.0986909}_{−0.0740577}	4652.000^{+111.602}_{−127.788}	
TOI-3851 b		0.425±0.024	3.383445±0.000012			transit	973.204 ^{+8.134}_{−8.004}	1.050000^{+0.133817}_{−0.117057}	5838.0000^{+82.3587}_{−171.3070}	
TOI-4307 b		0.124±0.006	32.696842^{+0.000069}_{−0.000058}			transit	117.570 ^{+0.078}_{−0.077}	1.140000^{+0.154653}_{−0.148798}	6079.160^{+116.841}_{−96.668}	
TOI-4310 b		0.265^{+0.028}_{−0.027}	29.566602^{+0.000065}_{−0.000063}			transit	130.553 ^{+0.283}_{−0.282}	0.6500000^{+0.0676102}_{−0.0875456}	4159.0000^{+91.9849}_{−163.1930}	
TOI-4324 b		0.110±0.005	6.2509291^{+0.0000060}_{−0.0000057}			transit	55.572±0.058	0.3862740±0.0203574	3479±157	
TOI-435 b		0.360^{+0.044}_{−0.040}	3.352919^{+0.000012}_{−0.000013}			transit	539.104 ^{+1.797}_{−1.784}	0.6320000^{+0.0733118}_{−0.0909289}	4040.000^{+127.594}_{−119.957}	
TOI-4443 c		0.198^{+0.014}_{−0.012}	10.308817^{+0.000022}_{−0.000024}			transit	182.880 ^{+0.312}_{−0.311}	1.050000^{+0.134372}_{−0.142451}	5834.000^{+145.127}_{−112.276}	
TOI-4499 b		0.191±0.014	5.53888^{+0.00014}_{−0.00018}			transit	573.201 ^{+2.182}_{−2.169}	1.151000^{+0.192765}_{−0.130401}	6111.0000^{+98.0481}_{−151.7020}	
TOI-4567 b		0.208±0.012	23.542503^{+0.000056}_{−0.000085}			transit	297.824±0.634	0.5949670±0.0202493	3830±157	
TOI-4724 b		0.285^{+0.025}_{−0.024}	3.5761^{+0.0013}_{−0.0012}			transit	734.710 ^{+6.944}_{−6.820}	1.023000^{+0.141358}_{−0.115567}	5730.000^{+135.253}_{−134.681}	
TOI-4851 b		0.247±0.014	21.609130^{+0.000089}_{−0.000067}			transit	410.220 ^{+1.556}_{−1.546}	1.090000^{+0.139642}_{−0.144518}	5967.000^{+147.641}_{−118.336}	
TOI-5165 b		0.296^{+0.054}_{−0.046}	3.577048^{+0.000043}_{−0.000051}			transit	800.220 ^{+6.875}_{−6.758}	0.7400000^{+0.1152430}_{−0.0549393}	4642.1000^{+124.5690}_{−91.1675}	
TOI-5177 b		0.172±0.012	2.208640±0.000027			transit	505.485 ^{+3.823}_{−3.770}	1.180000^{+0.210969}_{−0.117239}	6183.000^{+144.004}_{−112.632}	
TOI-5289 b		0.391^{+0.028}_{−0.027}	3.441056^{+0.000021}_{−0.000018}			transit	843.478 ^{+15.016}_{−14.511}	0.8960000^{+0.1354530}_{−0.0967443}	5244.000^{+137.373}_{−113.848}	
TOI-5493 b		0.211±0.015	14.56485^{+0.00013}_{−0.00017}			transit	735.508 ^{+8.376}_{−8.193}	1.168000^{+0.172306}_{−0.143644}	6151.000^{+116.904}_{−136.444}	
TOI-5531 b		0.130±0.011	4.535285^{+0.000040}_{−0.000033}			transit	263.024 ^{+1.116}_{−1.107}	1.040000^{+0.139173}_{−0.121229}	5788.420^{+148.804}_{−156.916}	
TOI-5543 b		0.337±0.022	3.5424576^{+0.0000051}_{−0.0000049}			transit	408.368 ^{+2.254}_{−2.228}	0.845000^{+0.100373}_{−0.107113}	5058.000^{+136.240}_{−120.646}	
TOI-5696 b		0.231±0.014	32.43016^{+0.00012}_{−0.00015}			transit	216.737 ^{+0.801}_{−0.795}	0.9000000^{+0.1433610}_{−0.0733753}	5271.000^{+88.812}_{−141.883}	
TOI-5730 b		0.125±0.009	1.9271070^{+0.0000098}_{−0.0000059}			transit	133.701±0.346	0.4615550±0.0202325	3572±157	
TOI-5739 b		0.208±0.012	8.430524^{+0.000064}_{−0.000058}			transit	201.782 ^{+0.607}_{−0.604}	1.150000^{+0.186468}_{−0.124249}	6104.1200^{+81.5899}_{−125.0210}	
TOI-5807 b		0.248^{+0.014}_{−0.012}	14.241844^{+0.000087}_{−0.000092}			transit	237.961 ^{+0.481}_{−0.480}	1.470000^{+0.326418}_{−0.151833}	6815.850^{+114.026}_{−107.192}	
TOI-5947 b		0.207^{+0.014}_{−0.013}	6.932019^{+0.000022}_{−0.000028}			transit	187.947 ^{+0.684}_{−0.679}	0.95000000^{+0.13216400}_{−0.09650850}	5451.000^{+110.883}_{−134.552}	
TOI-5958 b		0.169±0.013	2.3061827^{+0.0000099}_{−0.0000062}			transit	355.501 ^{+1.676}_{−1.660}	1.046000^{+0.164124}_{−0.109417}	5816.000^{+121.301}_{−173.978}	
TOI-5961 b		0.123^{+0.014}_{−0.015}	1.6175105^{+0.0000028}_{−0.0000021}			transit	85.632±0.080	0.6000000^{+0.0615399}_{−0.0997653}	3900.680^{+102.238}_{−149.259}	
TOI-5968 b		0.240±0.015	9.215040^{+0.000164}_{−0.000076}			transit	400.623 ^{+1.761}_{−1.748}	1.085000^{+0.141441}_{−0.131057}	5940.000^{+109.468}_{−147.661}	
TOI-5997 b		0.129±0.012	5.655007±0.000012			transit	151.731 ^{+0.164}_{−0.163}	0.7400000^{+0.0942718}_{−0.0882032}	4674.0000^{+172.8280}_{−73.7617}	
Elias 2-24 b	2.95±1.05			54.9±4.3		imaging	442.736±6.601	0.78^{+0.35}_{−0.13}	4483±123	
TOI-2158 c	1.62±0.13		414.5^{+1.5}_{−1.6}			radial vel.	647.486 ^{+4.576}_{−4.511}	1.12±0.05	5673±50	
TOI-5120 b	1.23±0.05	0.969±0.017	24.91645±0.00002	0.172±0.007	796±18	transit	750.126 ^{+6.448}_{−6.344}	1.12±0.05	5763±90	
TOI-5699 b	0.25±0.03	0.996±0.015	22.01850±0.00004	0.160±0.019	906±55	transit	994.049 ^{+6.738}_{−6.647}	1.13±0.04	5905±100	
TIC 219893931 b		0.261±0.033	6.410389±0.000151			transit	1338.989 ^{+13.904}_{−13.627}	1.140±0.092	5956±174	
TIC 237254473 b		0.294±0.026	10.117702±0.000159			transit	1326.413 ^{+10.264}_{−10.111}	1.12±0.09	5700±167	
TOI-1355 b		1.424^{+0.039}_{−0.041}	2.1702642^{+0.0000072}_{−0.0000074}	0.0400±0.0012	2740±120	transit	809.429	2.00^{+0.21}_{−0.13}	8660^{+360}_{−310}	
K2-105 c	0.0349±0.0085		5.02173^{+0.00042}_{−0.00065}	0.0559±0.0002	1037±5	radial vel.	645.835	0.925±0.047	5400±109	
TOI-713 b	0.005519^{+0.001010}_{−0.001026}	0.1043^{+0.0087}_{−0.0088}	1.87152392922476			transit	226.236	0.67	4316.7	
TOI-713 c	0.02052^{+0.00689}_{−0.00794}	0.1838^{+0.0152}_{−0.0157}	35.9994728661654			transit	226.236	0.67	4316.7	
TOI-214 b	0.00425±0.00145	0.08886±0.00446	9.695931			transit	127.070	0.92	5346.17	
TOI-214 c	0.0248^{+0.0019}_{−0.0021}	0.1732±0.0066	18.5537114			transit	127.070	0.92	5346.17	
TOI-5217 A b	1.282±0.060	0.0604^{+0.0011}_{−0.0012}	4.3712411±0.0000082	0.0604^{+0.0011}_{−0.0012}	1817^{+55}_{−53}	transit	1688.599	1.537±0.088	6140^{+150}_{−140}	
TOI-5893 b	0.9730^{+0.036}_{−0.035}	1.012^{+0.073}_{−0.072}	40.369376±0.000100	0.2348^{+0.0048}_{−0.0049}	638±12	transit	1046.081	1.058^{+0.066}_{−0.065}	5930±100	
TOI-6457 b	0.49±0.12	0.973^{+0.036}_{−0.035}	41.418325^{+0.000099}_{−0.000100}	0.2515^{+0.0041}_{−0.0047}	692.6^{+9.1}_{−8.8}	transit	860.780	1.237^{+0.061}_{−0.068}	6171^{+86}_{−88}	
TOI-6649 b	0.645^{+0.032}_{−0.033}	1.25^{+0.74}_{−0.45}	5.9877995^{+0.0000100}_{−0.0000098}	0.0697^{+0.0011}_{−0.0013}	1345^{+16}_{−15}	transit	656.456	1.259^{+0.059}_{−0.069}	6302^{+90}_{−89}	
TOI-6842 A b	0.302±0.035	1.647±0.039	5.3917436±0.0000025	0.06023^{+0.00110}_{−0.00097}	1327^{+19}_{−18}	transit	1304.918	1.002^{+0.057}_{−0.047}	5725^{+76}_{−72}	
TOI-7025 b	0.873^{+0.099}_{−0.095}	1.152±0.029	66.995436±0.000034	0.3485^{+0.0072}_{−0.0074}	624±11	transit	1400.254	1.258^{+0.080}_{−0.079}	6164^{+66}_{−67}	
TOI-7176 b	0.632±0.063	0.772±0.026	47.880^{+0.059}_{−0.065}	0.2292^{+0.0028}_{−0.0027}	376.9^{+6.1}_{−7.0}	transit	226.203	0.700^{+0.026}_{−0.024}	4507^{+82}_{−87}	
KMT-2026-BLG-0083L b	2.65^{+1.96}_{−1.55}			10.57^{+1.67}_{−2.23}		microlensing	20907	0.48^{+0.36}_{−0.28}		
KMT-2026-BLG-0083L c	1.54^{+1.14}_{−0.90}			1.65^{+0.26}_{−0.34}		microlensing	20907	0.48^{+0.36}_{−0.28}		
TOI-4596 b			4.119409^{+0.000006}_{−0.000008}			transit	304.924	1.02±0.02	5881^{+67}_{−73}	
TIC 220432308 b		0.202±0.047	3.330099±0.000008	0.0445±0.0018		transit	1141.310		5870±118	
RX J0534.0-0221 b	2.8±0.5	1.28±0.01	28000^{+26000}_{−10000}	14^{+7}_{−3}	674^{+57}_{−49}	imaging	112.044	0.43^{+0.03}_{−0.01}	3530^{+20}_{−10}	
TOI-2535 b		0.844^{+0.027}_{−0.029}	8.2358054±0.0000079			transit	1120.873	0.864^{+0.036}_{−0.028}	5256±80	
OGLE-2013-BLG-1125L b	0.330±0.041			>1.0		microlensing	3261.564±267.448	0.139±0.011		
OGLE-2015-BLG-1395L b	0.17±0.04			3.04±0.74		microlensing	8153.909±652.313	0.26±0.03		

== Specific exoplanet lists ==
Lists of exoplanets

- List of directly imaged exoplanets
- List of exoplanet extremes
- List of exoplanet firsts
- List of exoplanets discovered by the Kepler space telescope
- List of exoplanets observed during Kepler's K2 mission
- List of exoplanets discovered by the TESS mission
- List of terrestrial exoplanet candidates for atmosphere detection
- List of hottest exoplanets
- List of coldest exoplanets
- List of multiplanetary systems
- List of circumbinary planets
- List of nearest exoplanets
- List of nearest terrestrial exoplanet candidates
- List of potentially habitable exoplanets
- List of proper names of exoplanets
- List of largest exoplanets
- List of smallest exoplanets
- List of transiting exoplanets
- List of exoplanets and planetary debris around giant stars
- List of exoplanets and planetary debris around white dwarfs
- List of extrasolar planetary collisions

=== Lists of exoplanets by year of discovery ===
- List of exoplanets discovered before 2000 (31)
- List of exoplanets discovered between 2000–2009 (376)
- List of exoplanets discovered in 2010 (109)
- List of exoplanets discovered in 2011 (178)
- List of exoplanets discovered in 2012 (147)
- List of exoplanets discovered in 2013 (149)
- List of exoplanets discovered in 2014 (869)
- List of exoplanets discovered in 2015 (144)
- List of exoplanets discovered in 2016 (1497)
- List of exoplanets discovered in 2017 (152)
- List of exoplanets discovered in 2018 (300)
- List of exoplanets discovered in 2019 (169)
- List of exoplanets discovered in 2020 (256)
- List of exoplanets discovered in 2021 (253)
- List of exoplanets discovered in 2022 (312)
- List of exoplanets discovered in 2023 (304)
- List of exoplanets discovered in 2024 (284)
- List of exoplanets discovered in 2025 (239)
- List of exoplanets discovered in 2026 (359)
