= HD 114783 =

Star in the constellation Virgo

Observation data Epoch J2000 Equinox ICRS
- Constellation: Virgo
- Right ascension: 13^{h} 12^{m} 43.78556^{s}
- Declination: −02° 15′ 54.1307″
- Apparent magnitude (V): 7.56

Characteristics
- Spectral type: K1V
- B−V color index: 0.930±0.013
- Variable type: Constant

Astrometry
Radial velocity (R_{v})	−12.07±0.12 km/s
Proper motion (μ)	RA: −138.362(34) mas/yr Dec.: 10.284(22) mas/yr
Parallax (π)	47.5529±0.0291 mas
Distance	68.59 ± 0.04 ly (21.03 ± 0.01 pc)
Absolute magnitude (M_{V})	6.00

Details
Mass	0.883+0.018 −0.028 M_{☉}
Radius	0.810+0.011 −0.009 R_{☉}
Luminosity	0.423±0.001 L_{☉}
Surface gravity (log g)	4.42±0.58 cgs
Temperature	5,114±12 K
Metallicity [Fe/H]	0.08±0.11 dex
Rotational velocity (v sin i)	1.9±0.5 km/s
Age	2.5+3.0 −1.6 Gyr

Other designations
- BD−01°2784, GJ 3769, HD 114783, HIP 64457, SAO 139218

Database references
SIMBAD	data
Exoplanet Archive	data
ARICNS	data

HD 114783 is a star with two exoplanetary companions in the equatorial constellation of Virgo. With an apparent visual magnitude of 7.56 it is too faint to be visible with the unaided eye, but is an easy target for binoculars. Based on parallax measurements, it is located at a distance of 68.6 light-years (21.0 parsecs) from the Sun, but is drifting closer with a radial velocity of −12 km/s.

This is an orange-hued K-type main-sequence star with a stellar classification of K1V. It is roughly 2.5 billion years old and is chromospherically inactive with a low projected rotational velocity of 1.9 km/s. The star has 88% of the mass and 81% of the radius of the Sun. It is radiating 42% of the luminosity of the Sun from its photosphere at an effective temperature of 5,114 K.

In 2001, the California and Carnegie Planet Search team found an exoplanet, HD 114783 b, orbiting the star using the radial velocity method. The discovery was made with the Keck Telescope. A second companion, HD 114783 c, was discovered in 2016, and in 2023 its inclination and true mass were measured by the first time, via astrometry. The masses and orbits were revised in 2025.

The HD 114783 planetary system
Companion (in order from star)	Mass	Semimajor axis (AU)	Orbital period (years)	Eccentricity	Inclination (°)	Radius
b	≥ 1.043±0.038 M_{J}	1.180+0.019 −0.021	1.34858(82)	0.121+0.013 −0.014	—	—
c	1.47+0.58 −0.63 M_{J}	5.03±0.12	11.89+0.30 −0.27	0.074+0.047 −0.045	21+7 −4 or 152+8 −27	—

== See also ==
- HD 114386
- List of extrasolar planets
