= TOI-5734 b =

Hot sub-Neptune orbiting TOI-5734

Discovery
- Discovered by: S. Filomeno et al.
- Discovery date: February 20, 2026
- Detection method: Transit

Orbital characteristics
- Semi-major axis: 0.05921±0.00024 AU
- Orbital period (sidereal): 6.1841876+0.0000080 −0.0000094 d
- Inclination: 89.88+0.12 −0.63
- Star: TOI-5734

Physical characteristics
- Mean radius: 2.10±0.12 R_{🜨}
- Mass: 9.10±2.60 M_{🜨}
- Mean density: 0.98+0.36 −0.30 ρ🜨
- Surface gravity: 20.2+6.6 −6.0 m/s^{2}
- Temperature: 688 ± 23 K (414.9 ± 23.0 °C; 778.7 ± 41.4 °F)

Atmosphere
- Composition by volume: None or extremely thin

TOI-5734 b is a confirmed exoplanet orbiting the young orange dwarf star TOI-5734, a K3-K4 spectral class star, at a distance of approximately 106 light-years from the Sun. The discovery of the object was officially announced by an international team of astronomers led by Simone Filomeno in late February 2026.

The planet is classified as a hot sub-Neptune with a density of 0.98 ρ🜨, a mass of 9.1 M🜨, and a radius of approximately 2.1 R🜨. The planet completes a full orbit around its star in approximately 6.18 Earth days at an average distance of about 0.06 AU. The equilibrium surface temperature is estimated to be 688 K, or about 415 °C. The object's density indicates a rocky composition. It is hypothesized that the planet has almost entirely lost its primordial hydrogen-helium atmosphere due to intense irradiation from its host star.

Size comparison
Earth	TOI-5734 b
	Exoplanet

The parameters of TOI-5734 b place it at the upper boundary of the radius gap. This makes it a priority target for studying the transition from gaseous sub-Neptunes to rocky super-Earths.

== Discovery and observation ==
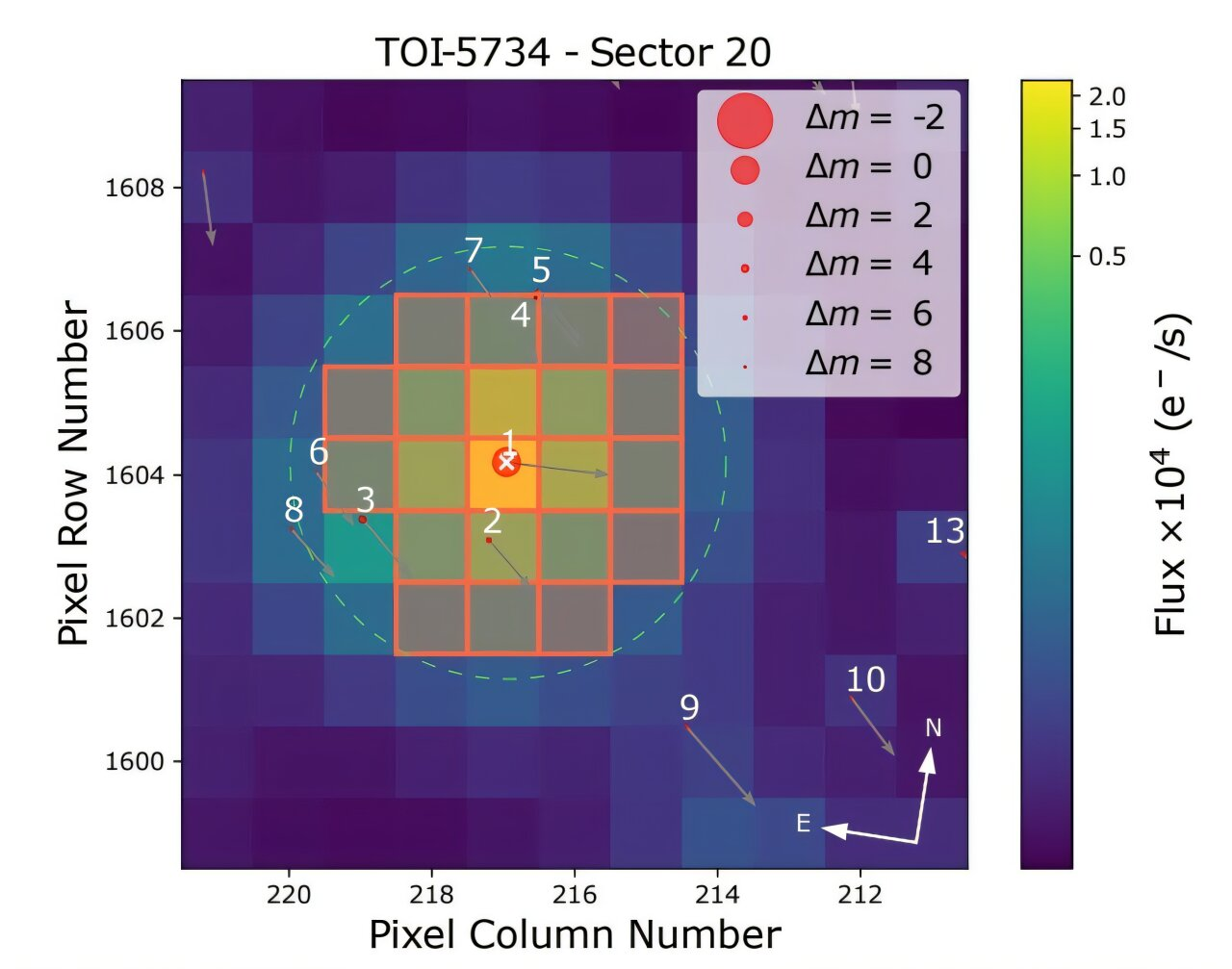
TESS target pixel file of Sector 20 of TOI-5734, which is marked with ‘1’.

Primary signs of the planet's existence were recorded in 2022 using the TESS space telescope. It detected periodic dips in the brightness of the star TIC 9989136 in three different observation sectors, indicating the transit of an object across its disk. Following this initial detection, the object was assigned the status of TESS Object of Interest, abbreviated TOI, under the number 5734.01.

Final confirmation of the signal's planetary nature and the determination of the object's physical characteristics were carried out by an international group of astronomers led by Simone Filomeno. The results were published on February 20, 2026, in The Astrophysical Journal Letters under the title "The GAPS Programme at the TNG: LXX. TOI-5734b: A hot sub-Neptune orbiting a relatively young K dwarf with an Earth-like density".

== Host star ==
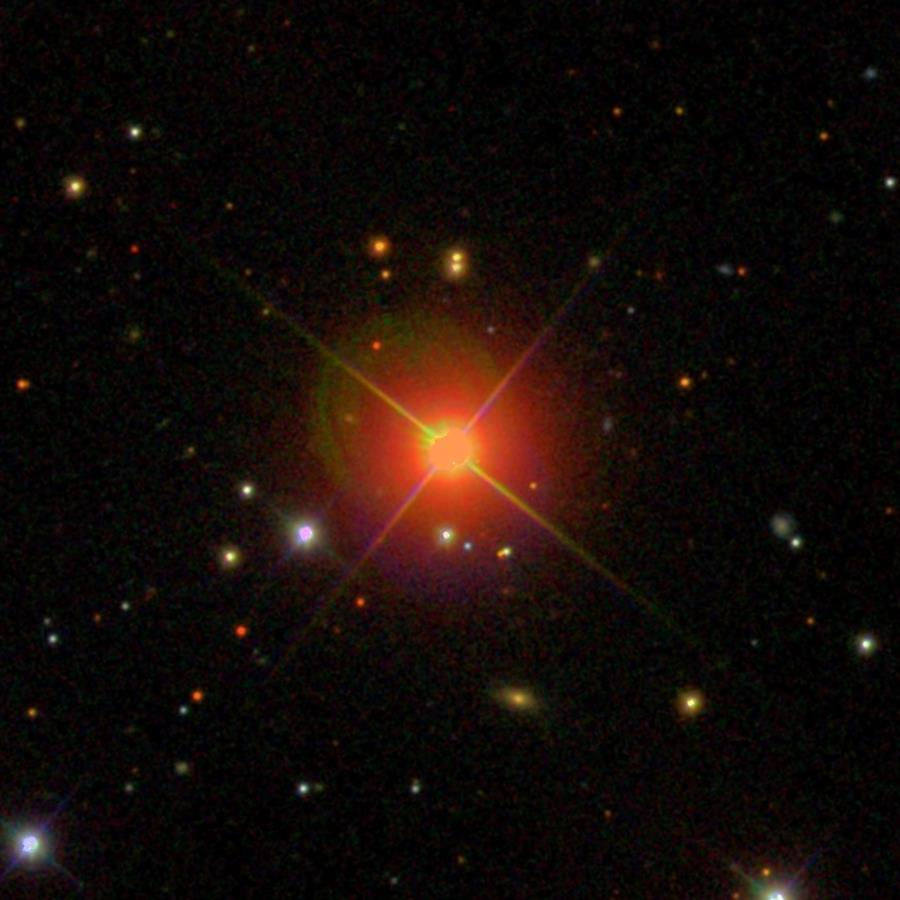
SDSS image of TOI-5734 (center star)

The star TOI-5734, also known as TIC 9989136, located at a distance of approximately 106 light-years in the constellation of Auriga, is a relatively young K3-K4 V spectral type dwarf star. Its radius is about 0.64 solar radii, and its mass is approximately 0.72 solar masses. The effective temperature of TOI-5734 is estimated to be 4750 K. The age of the system is 500 million years or 0.5 billion years. The rotation period is about 11 days, which is characteristic of young stars of this type and correlates with its magnetic activity level. Its apparent magnitude is 9.61, making it too faint for the naked eye, though it is visible through a small telescope.

== Atmosphere ==
Modeling of atmospheric evolution shows that TOI-5734 b possesses an almost completely depleted primary envelope. Initially, the planet likely had an extended hydrogen-helium atmosphere, characteristic of sub-Neptunes.

Despite the loss of primary gases, scientists do not rule out a scenario in which the planet could be an ocean world with a secondary atmosphere rich in volatiles, such as water vapor.

The planet's high density indicates that it is currently a predominantly rocky body with a minimal or no gaseous envelope.

=== Evolutionary processes ===
The primary mechanism for atmospheric loss is considered to be intense X-ray and ultraviolet radiation from its host star. Due to its proximity to the star, the planet is subjected to strong heating, leading to hydrodynamic outflow of gases. Astronomers estimate that the planet will completely lose the remnants of its primary envelope within 300 million years.

It is hypothesized that during its existence, the planet likely migrated from a region of larger radii on the mass-radius diagram to its current position near the radius gap.

== See also ==
- List of exoplanets discovered in 2026
