= TOI-375 d =

Gas giant exoplanet

Discovery
- Discovered by: Astronomers using the Transiting Exoplanet Survey Satellite
- Discovery date: 2026
- Detection method: Radial velocity

Orbital characteristics
- Semi-major axis: 0.984 ± 0.053
- Orbital period (sidereal): 297.9^{+28.9}_{−18.6} days
- Star: TOI-375

Physical characteristics
- Mean radius: 1.21 R_{J} (estimated)
- Mass: 1.40 ± 0.28 M_{J}
- Temperature: 434 K

TOI-375 d is a gas giant exoplanet orbiting the evolved K-type star TOI-375, located approximately 396 parsecs (about 1,290 light-years) from Earth. The planet was discovered in 2026 using the radial velocity method during follow-up observations of the TOI-375 planetary system.

The planet is the outermost known member of the TOI-375 planetary system, which contains at least three confirmed giant planets.

== Discovery ==
The TOI-375 system was initially investigated after the discovery of the transiting hot Jupiter TOI-375 b by NASA's Transiting Exoplanet Survey Satellite (TESS). Subsequent spectroscopic observations revealed additional radial velocity signals indicating the presence of two outer giant planets, designated TOI-375 c and TOI-375 d.

The discovery paper describing the system was published in Monthly Notices of the Royal Astronomical Society in 2026.

== Host star ==
TOI-375 d orbits the evolved K-type star TOI-375. The host star has a mass greater than that of the Sun and is believed to be evolving away from the main sequence.

== Characteristics ==
TOI-375 d is classified as a gas giant planet with a minimum mass approximately 1.4 times that of Jupiter. Since the planet does not transit its host star from the perspective of Earth, its radius and true mass remain uncertain.

The planet orbits its host star at a distance similar to that between the Earth and the Sun, completing one orbit every 297.9 days. The equilibrium temperature of the planet is estimated to be approximately 434 K due to radiation from its evolved host star.

== Planetary system ==
TOI-375 d is part of a multi-planet system containing at least three known planets.

The TOI-375 system's multiple giant planets orbiting an evolved star make it important for studies of planetary formation and migration.

== See also ==
- Exoplanet
- Gas giant
- Hot Jupiter
- Radial velocity
- List of exoplanets discovered in 2026
- Transiting Exoplanet Survey Satellite
