= KMT-2016-BLG-1337Lb =

Exoplanet orbiting within a binary system of low-mass stars

- Artistic illustration of KMT-2016-BLG-1337Lb revolving around one of its parent stars

Discovery
- Discovered by: Cheongho Han et al.
- Discovery site: KMTNet
- Discovery date: February 13, 2026
- Detection method: Microlensing

Orbital characteristics
- Semi-major axis: 3.97+0.60 −0.92 AU or 1.49+0.22 −0.35 AU
- Star: KMT-2016-BLG-1337L

Physical characteristics
- Mass: 0.28+0.15 −0.16 M_{J} or 7.11+3.93 −3.98 M_{J}

KMT-2016-BLG-1337Lb is an exoplanet located approximately 7000 parsecs from Earth, in the constellation Sagittarius, and is part of a binary system consisting of low-mass stars, KMT-2016-BLG-1337. It was discovered in 2026 by an international team of astronomers during a re-analysis of gravitational microlensing data collected by the KMTNet telescope network.

== Host stars ==
The binary KMT-2016-BLG-1337L is located in the constellation Sagittarius at a distance of 22570 light-years, or approximately 7000 parsecs from Earth. This is a system consisting of two red dwarf stars with masses of approximately 0.54±0.30 M_{☉} and 0.40±0.22 M_{☉}, and the distance between them is approximately 3.5 astronomical units.

== Characteristics ==
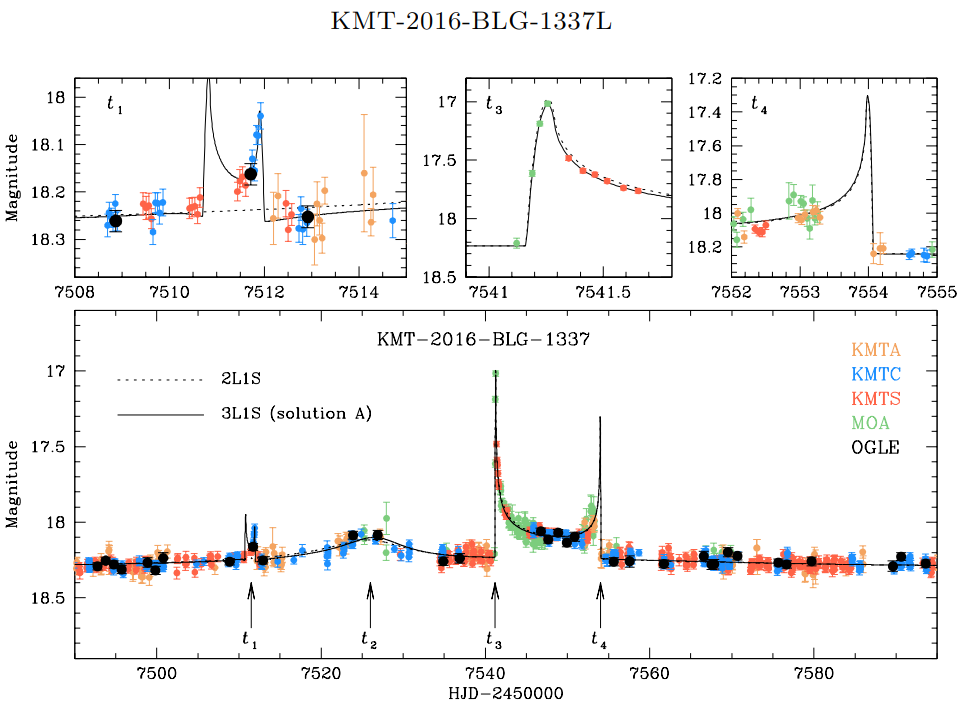
Light curve of the microlensing event KMT-2016-BLG-1337

The planet does not have a clear or definitive characteristic, as astronomers encountered the "degeneracy" problem when modeling the light curve. Therefore, they used two possible mathematical models – solutions that explain the obtained observational data.

=== Solution A ===
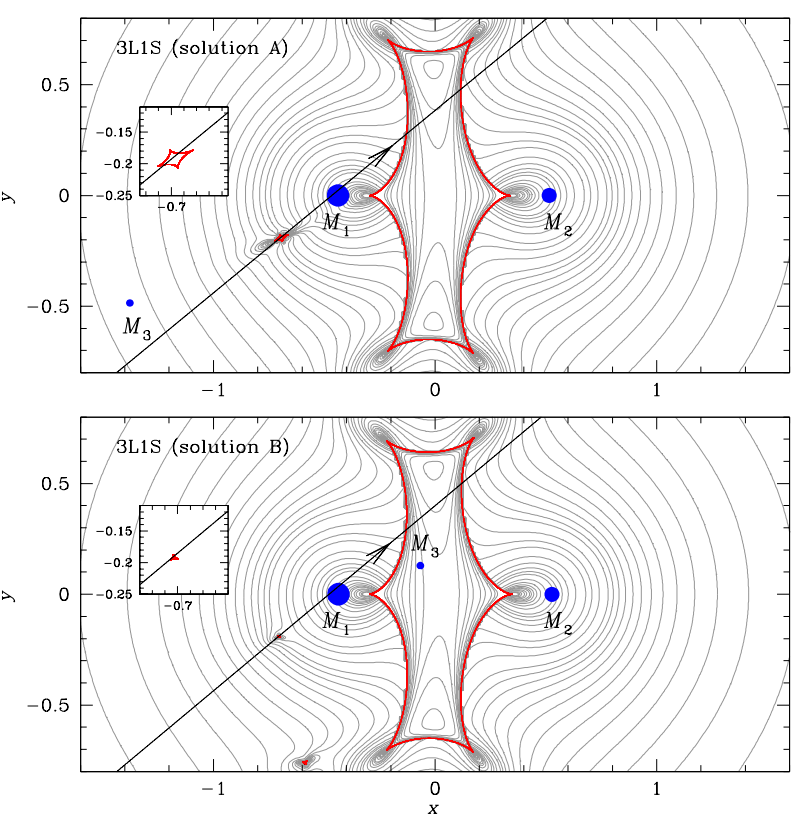
Lens-system configurations for the two 3L1S solutions

In the first case, the planet is an object with a mass of 0.28+0.15
−0.16 M_{J}, comparable to the mass of Saturn, orbiting one of the stars in the system and located at an arbitrary distance of 3.97+0.60
−0.92 AU from the star. The radius of KMT-2016-BLG-1337Lb was not measured. This solution exhibits better statistical indicators of agreement with the observed light curve.

=== Solution B ===
Despite this, a second scenario for the development of events also exists, where the planet orbits one of the stars, but its dynamic interaction with the parent stars is described differently using microlensing parameters. The object would be a super-Jupiter, with a mass of 7.11+3.93
−3.98 M_{J}, located at a smaller arbitrary distance of 1.49+0.22
−0.35 AU. This solution is considered mathematically possible but less probable in terms of data fitting accuracy.

The precise values for the star's mass and distance are still subject to refinement.

== See also ==
- List of exoplanets discovered in 2026
- Korea Microlensing Telescope Network
