= HD 114783 b =

Exoplanet that has a minimum mass similar to Jupiter

Discovery
- Discovered by: Vogt, Butler, Marcy et al.
- Discovery site: Keck Observatory
- Discovery date: October 15, 2001
- Detection method: Radial velocity

Orbital characteristics
- Apastron: 1.268 AU (189,700,000 km)
- Periastron: 1.070 AU (160,100,000 km)
- Semi-major axis: 1.169 ± 0.068 AU (174,900,000 ± 10,200,000 km)
- Eccentricity: 0.085 ± 0.033
- Orbital period (sidereal): 496.9 ± 2.3 d 1.360 y
- Average orbital speed: 25.69
- Time of periastron: 2,450,840 ±37
- Argument of periastron: 93 ± 25
- Semi-amplitude: 30.2±0.75
- Star: HD 114783

HD 114783 b is an exoplanet that has a minimum mass almost exactly that of Jupiter. However, since the true mass is not known, it may be more massive, but not likely much. It orbits the star 20% further than Earth orbits the Sun. The orbit is quite circular.

== See also ==
- HD 114386 b
