= HD 114386 b =

Extrasolar planet in the constellation Centaurus

Discovery
- Discovered by: Mayor et al.
- Discovery site: La Silla Observatory, Chile
- Discovery date: 10 February 2004
- Detection method: Radial velocity (CORALIE)

Orbital characteristics
- Apastron: 2.03 AU (304,000,000 km)
- Periastron: 1.27 AU (190,000,000 km)
- Semi-major axis: 1.65 AU (247,000,000 km)
- Eccentricity: 0.23 ± 0.03
- Orbital period (sidereal): 937.7 ± 15.6 d 2.567 y
- Average orbital speed: 19.2
- Time of periastron: 2,450,454 ± 43
- Argument of periastron: 273° ± 14
- Semi-amplitude: 34.3 ± 1.6
- Star: HD 114386

Physical characteristics
- Mass: >1.24 M_{J} (>394 M_{🜨})

HD 114386 b is an exoplanet orbiting the star HD 114386. The planet orbits the star in a rather eccentric orbit. Mean distance from the star is 1.62 AU, somewhat more than distance between Mars and the Sun. At periastron, the planet comes almost as close as Earth orbits the Sun, and at apoastron, the distance is twice as much.

== See also ==
- HD 114783 b
