= TOI-4616 b =

Earth-sized exoplanet orbiting a mid-M dwarf

- Artistic depiction of a rocky super-Earth, orbiting a red dwarf, similar to TOI-4616 b

Discovery
- Discovered by: F. Zong Lang et al.
- Discovery site: Transiting Exoplanet Survey Satellite
- Discovery date: March 11, 2026 (Published)
- Detection method: Transit

Designations
- Alternative names: LP 466-156 b, TIC 258796169 b

Orbital characteristics
- Eccentricity: 0 (fixed)
- Orbital period (sidereal): 1.55382±0.00001 d
- Argument of perihelion: 90
- Star: TOI-4616

Physical characteristics
- Mean radius: 1.22 R_{🜨}
- Mass: 2.25±0.75 M_{🜨}
- Temperature: 525 K (252 °C; 485 °F)

TOI-4616 b (also known as LP 466-156 b) is a confirmed exoplanet orbiting a mid-M dwarf star, TOI-4616, located approximately 91 light-years from Earth. It was discovered in March 2026 using the transit method by a team of scientists led by Francis Zong Lang.

== Properties ==
The planet is a super-Earth with a mass of 2.25 M_{🜨} and a radius of 1.22 R_{🜨}. It completes a full orbit around its star in 1.55 Earth days. The estimated equilibrium surface temperature is 525 K, or about 252 °C. The stellar radiation flux is 8.5 times the level of Earth's insolation from the Sun. This places TOI-4616 b in a regime intermediate between Earth-sized planets orbiting early M dwarfs and those around ultra-cool hosts.

Size comparison
Earth	TOI-4616 b
	Exoplanet

== Discovery and observation ==
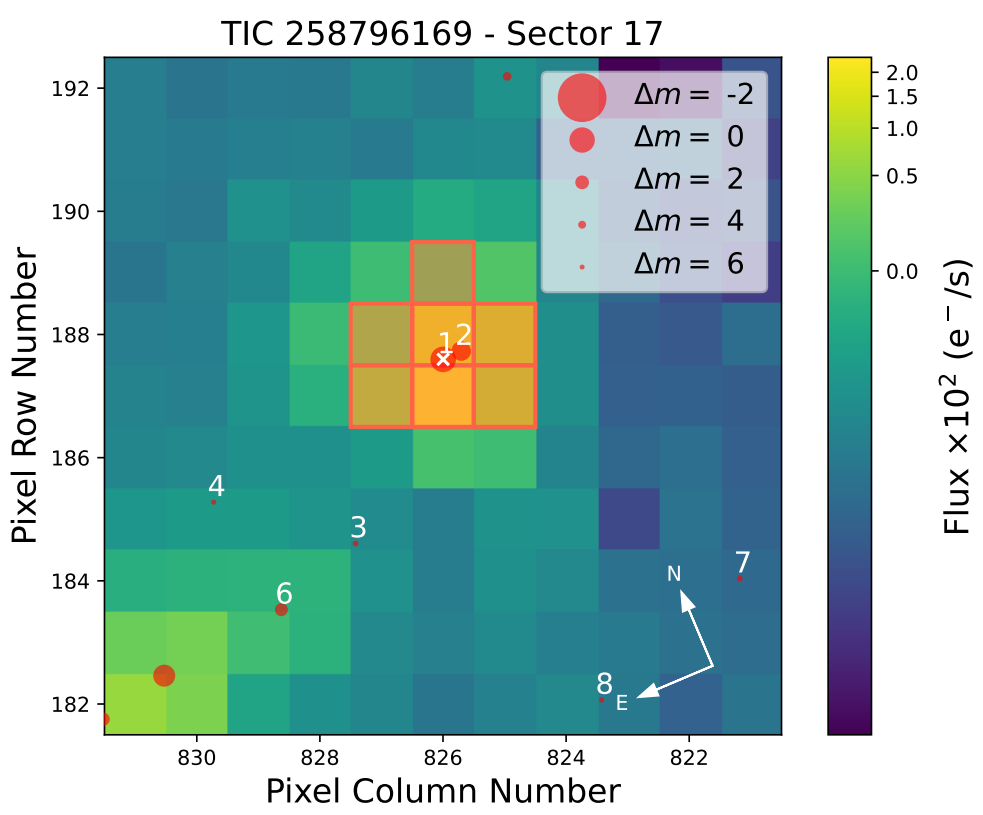
Target Pixel File (TPF) of TOI-4616 from TESS Sector 17

During the period from 2019 to 2021, the TESS space telescope detected transit signals from the star TIC 258796169 during observations of sectors 17, 42, 43, and 70. This indicated the passage of a potential celestial body in front of the star's disk. The object was cataloged as a candidate under the designation TOI-4616.01.

To rule out false positives, such as eclipsing binary stars or instrumental noise, the TESS data were shared with international teams of astronomers for analysis. From 2023 to 2025, additional ground-based observations were conducted using high-resolution photometry and adaptive optics to confirm that the transit signal originated from the target star.

The final confirmation of the planetary nature of the signal and the determination of the object's physical characteristics were carried out by an international team of astronomers led by Francis Zong Lang. The results were published on March 11, 2026, in The Astrophysical Journal Letters under the title: "TOI-4616 b: a benchmark Earth-sized planet transiting a nearby M4 dwarf." This publication compared TESS data with radial velocity measurements, which not only confirmed the presence of the planet but also allowed for the estimation of its mass and density. Statistical validation was performed using the TRICERATOPS software, which showed a false positive rate of only 0.0135, significantly below the confirmation threshold of 0.015.

== Hypothesized atmosphere ==
During the period between the initial detection of the candidate and its official confirmation, theoretical modeling of possible atmospheric scenarios was conducted. Given that the exoplanet belongs to the super-Earth class and orbits an active M-dwarf, the primary focus was on the issue of atmospheric retention under the influence of stellar wind and X-ray radiation.

By 2025, based on the Transmission Spectroscopy Metric, the exoplanet was classified as one of the most favorable targets for studying the atmospheres of rocky bodies. Its calculated index was approximately 17, significantly exceeding the threshold (TSM > 10) set for priority targets of the James Webb mission.

Following the official confirmation of the planet's status within the current observation cycles of the James Webb Space Telescope, TOI-4616 b is being considered as a target for the NIRISS instrument. The main objective is to search for spectral lines of water, carbon dioxide, and methane. The MIRI instrument is also planned to be used to measure the thermal emission from the planet's day side. This will allow for the determination of the presence or absence of a dense atmosphere: high heat transfer efficiency to the night side will be indirect evidence of a gaseous envelope.

== Host star ==
TOI-4616
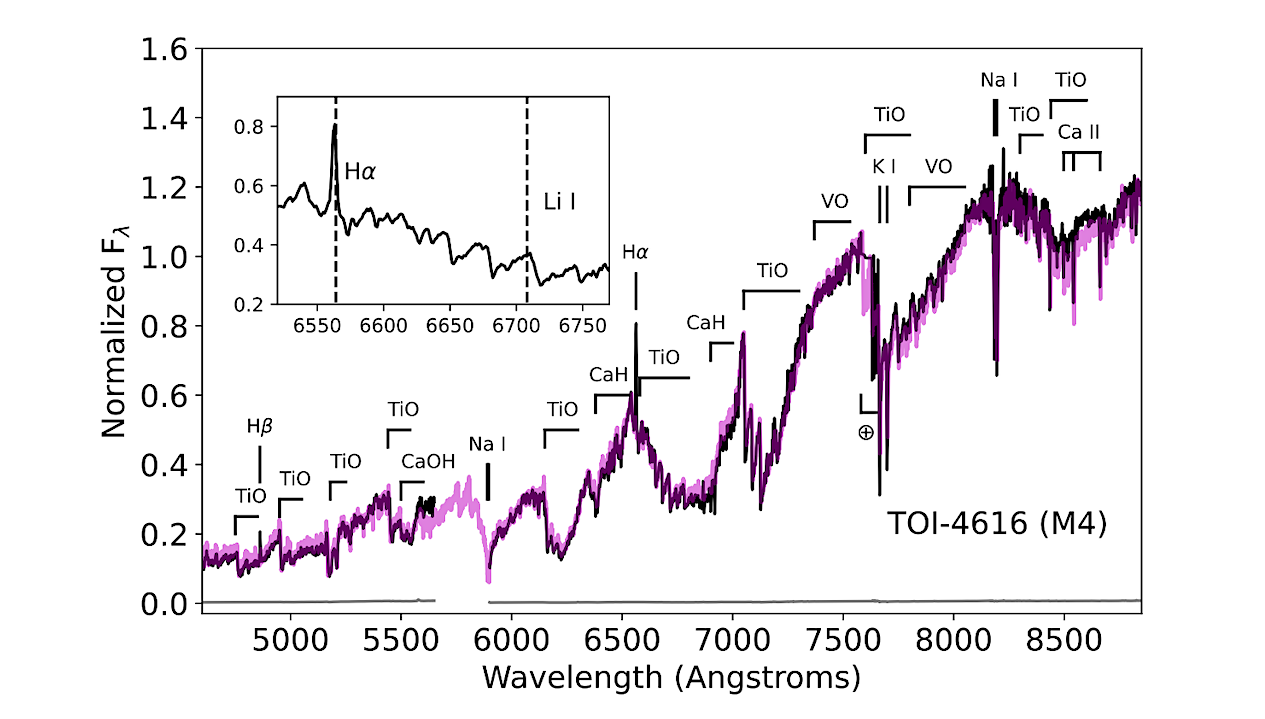
- Blue and red Shane/Kast optical spectrum of TOI-4616 (black line) compared to the best-fit M4 SDSS spectral template

Observation data Epoch J2000 Equinox ICRS
- Constellation: Boötes
- Right ascension: 00^{h} 59^{m} 16.308^{s}
- Declination: +31° 45′ 39.6489″
- Apparent magnitude (V): 14.65

Characteristics
- Evolutionary stage: Main sequence
- Spectral type: M4±0.5

Astrometry
Proper motion (μ)	RA: +31.509 mas/yr Dec.: +179.276 mas/yr
Parallax (π)	35.5096±0.0302 mas
Distance	91.85 ± 0.08 ly (28.16 ± 0.02 pc)
Absolute magnitude (M_{V})	12.4

Details
Mass	0.1881±0.0094 M_{☉}
Radius	0.1889±0.0096 R_{☉}
Luminosity	0.00404±0.00044 L_{☉}
Surface gravity (log g)	4.70±0.03 cgs
Temperature	3,150±75 K
Metallicity [Fe/H]	−0.32±0.11 dex
Rotation	1.2 d
Age	0.3 - 0.8 Gyr

Other designations
- LP 466-156, TIC 258796169, 2MASS J00591630+1351361, Gaia DR3 2042653052618584960

Database references
SIMBAD	data

TOI-4616 (also known as TIC 258796169) is a relatively cool red dwarf located in the zodiacal constellation Boötes, approximately 92 light-years away from Earth. It has a apparent magnitude of 14.65 and requires a powerful telescope for observation. The star's radius is about 0.1889 solar radii, its mass is approximately 0.1881 solar masses, and its temperature is around 3150 K. Despite this, TOI-4616 is metal-poor, with an iron abundance of only 32% of that found in the Sun. Like most red dwarfs, its luminosity is 0.00404 solar luminosities. Its age is estimated to be between 0.3 and 0.8 billion years, and its rotation period is 1.2 days.

== See also ==
- List of exoplanets discovered in 2026
