= TOI-6692 b =

Eccentric giant planet in orbit around TOI-6692

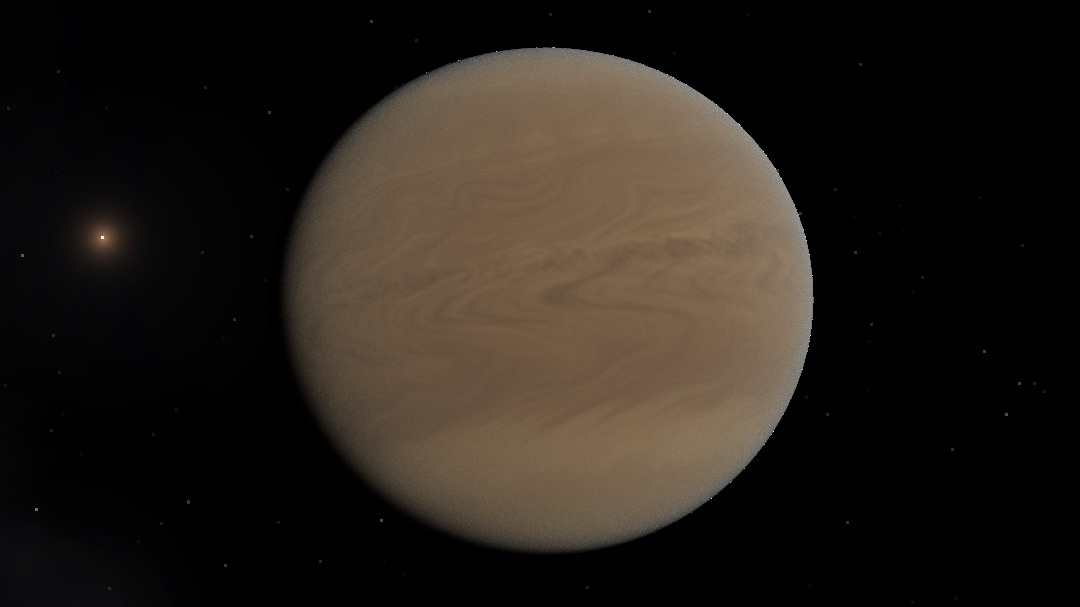
- Artistic representation of exoplanet TOI-6692 b

Discovery
- Discovered by: Allyson Bieryla et al.
- Discovery date: January 22, 2026
- Detection method: Transit

Designations
- Alternative names: TIC 324609409 b, WISE J205046.49-811620.4 b, 2MASS J20504634-8116202 b, Gaia DR2 6349145498210403840 b

Orbital characteristics
- Semi-major axis: 0.512+0.014 −0.012 AU
- Eccentricity: 0.537±0.061
- Orbital period (sidereal): 131.125±0.012 d
- Inclination: 89.483+0.083 −0.074
- Argument of perihelion: −16.6+7.9 −7.7
- Star: TOI-6692

Physical characteristics
- Mean radius: 1.042+0.050 −0.049 R_{J}
- Mass: 0.620+0.080 −0.065 M_{J}
- Temperature: 467 ± 9 K (193.85 ± 9.00 °C; 380.93 ± 16.20 °F)

TOI-6692 b is a confirmed exoplanet orbiting a G1 spectral class yellow dwarf or subgiant star, TOI-6692, at a distance of approximately 1013 light-years from the Sun. The discovery of the object was officially announced by an international team of astronomers led by Allison Bieri in late January 2026. This exoplanet was detected using the transit method.

The planet is a giant planet, with a mass of approximately 0.62 M_{J} and a radius of about 1.04 R_{J}. It orbits its host star at a distance of 0.512 AU, which is roughly half the distance from Earth to the Sun. One year on the planet is approximately 131 days. However, its orbit is highly eccentric, with an orbital eccentricity of 0.537. Its orbital inclination is 89.483°. The equilibrium temperature is estimated to be 467 K, or about 194 °C.

Astronomers note that TOI-6692 b is one of only a few giant planets with an orbital period exceeding 100 days for which both mass and radius have been measured. Furthermore, they add that this planet is also one of the few single-transit TESS targets whose period has been definitively confirmed through subsequent photometric follow-up.

== Host star ==
The host star TOI-6692, also known as TIC 324609409, is located approximately 1013 light-years from Earth. It is either a yellow dwarf or a yellow subgiant, with a mass of about 1.05 solar masses and a radius of around 1.38 solar radii. The star's age is estimated to be 7.8 billion years, its effective temperature is 5890 K, its metallicity is -0.008 dex, and its luminosity is twice that of the Sun, at 2.08 solar luminosities. Its apparent magnitude is 11.4, making it invisible to the naked eye, or even with a small telescope.

== Discovery and observation ==
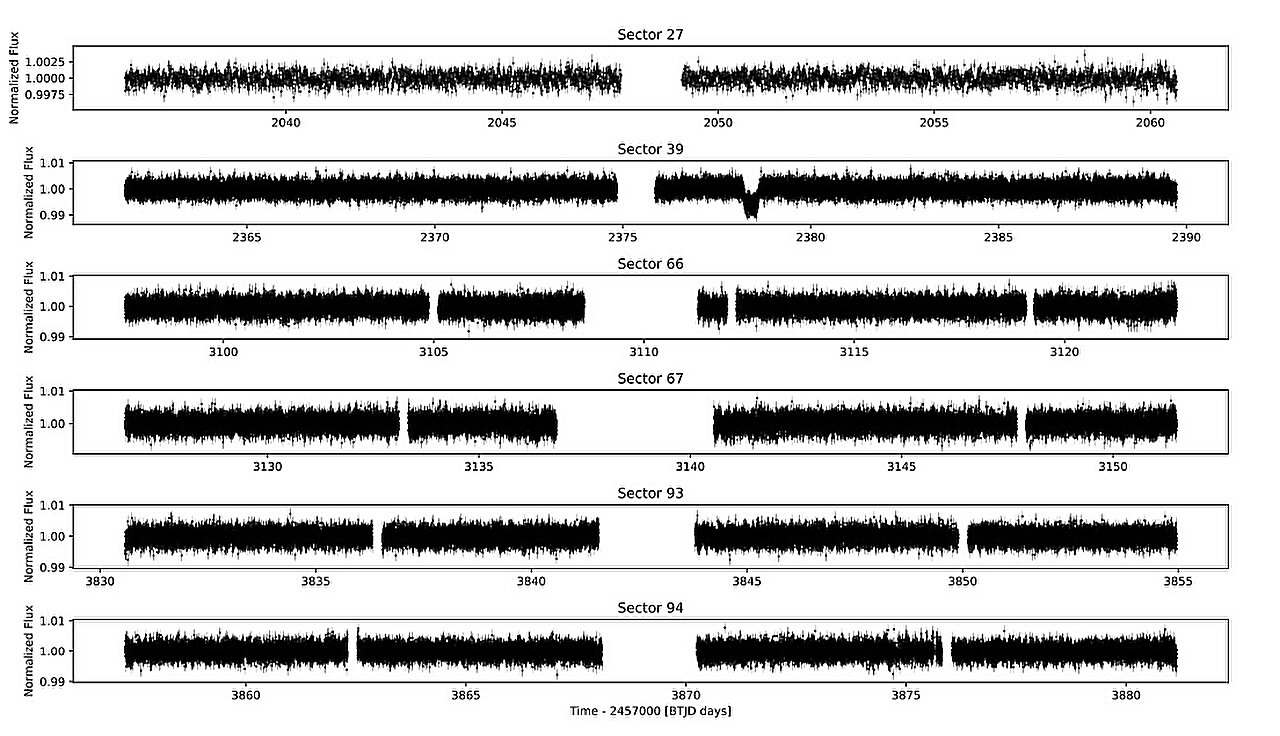
Per-sector Normalized TESS PDCSAP light curves for TOI-6692.

In 2021, the TESS space telescope detected a single dip in the brightness of the star TOI-6692 in Sector 36. Since at least two transits are required for automatic planet confirmation, the signal was initially missed by algorithms. It was subsequently discovered manually by participants of the Visual Survey Group and Planet Hunters, who specialize in finding single transits. Following this, the object was assigned the status of a TESS Object of Interest (TOI).

Ground-based resources were utilized to determine the mass and refine the orbital period. Regular measurements of the star's radial velocity were conducted between 2022 and 2025. The Planet Finder spectrograph on the 6.5-meter Magellan II Telescope (Las Campanas Observatory, Chile) made the primary contribution.

In January 2026, an international team of researchers led by Allison Bieler published their findings in The Astrophysical Journal Letters, titled: "TOI-6692b: An eccentric 130 day period giant planet with a single transit from TESS". The analysis of the radial velocity data revealed a long-term linear drift. This indicates the presence of an additional massive body in the system on a wide orbit, whose mass and orbital period remain undetermined for now. The high eccentricity points to gravitational interaction of the planet with another object (scattering), which led to the distortion of its orbit. The planet did not migrate peacefully through the protoplanetary disk.

== See also ==
- List of exoplanets discovered in 2026
