= TOI-5788 =

Metal-poor yellow dwarf in the constellation Lyra

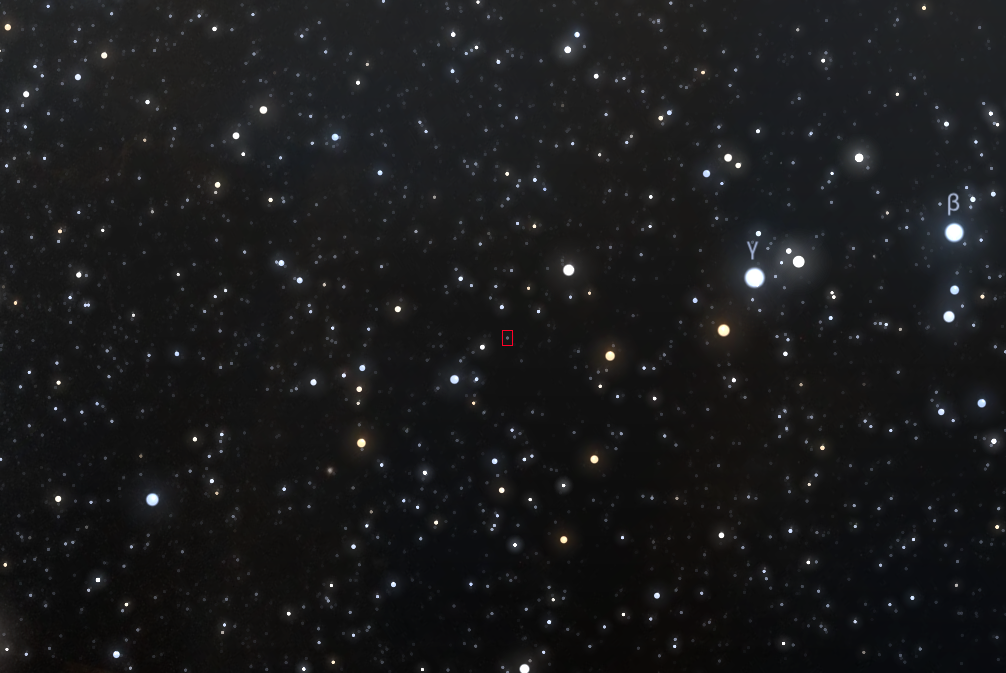
- Location of TOI-5788 in the night sky. The star is marked within the red rectangle.

Observation data Epoch J2000 Equinox ICRS
- Constellation: Lyra
- Right ascension: 19^{h} 09^{m} 41.95531^{s}
- Declination: +31° 45′ 39.6489″
- Apparent magnitude (V): 10.15

Characteristics
- Evolutionary stage: Main sequence
- Spectral type: G4 V

Astrometry
Radial velocity (R_{v})	−59.36 km/s
Proper motion (μ)	RA: +17.353 mas/yr Dec.: +119.563 mas/yr
Parallax (π)	10.2688±0.0123 mas
Distance	317.6 ± 0.4 ly (97.4 ± 0.1 pc)

Details
Mass	0.87±0.04 M_{☉}
Radius	0.87±0.006 R_{☉}
Luminosity	0.712±0.018 L_{☉}
Surface gravity (log g)	4.42±0.01 cgs
Temperature	5,615±25 K
Metallicity [Fe/H]	−0.32±0.04 dex
Rotational velocity (v sin i)	≤ 2 km/s
Age	5.72+3.37 −2.65 Gyr

Other designations
- BD+31 3477, TOI-5788, TIC 42883782, TYC 2640-273-1, 2MASS J19094195+3145395, Gaia DR3 2042653052618584960

Database references
SIMBAD	data

TOI-5788 (also known as TIC 42883782) is a metal-poor yellow dwarf of spectral class G4, located approximately 318 light-years away from us in the zodiacal constellation Lyra. Its apparent visual magnitude is 10.15, making it invisible to the naked eye but observable with a standard telescope. Two exoplanets orbit it, designated as TOI-5788 b and TOI-5788 c, where the former is classified as a rocky planet and the latter is a mini-Neptune.

The object's parameters are close to those of the Sun, but it possesses a significantly lower metallicity of -0.32, a mass and radius of 0.87, with an effective surface temperature reaching 5615 K. The star's age is estimated to be approximately 5.7 billion years, making it somewhat older than the Sun.

== Planetary system ==
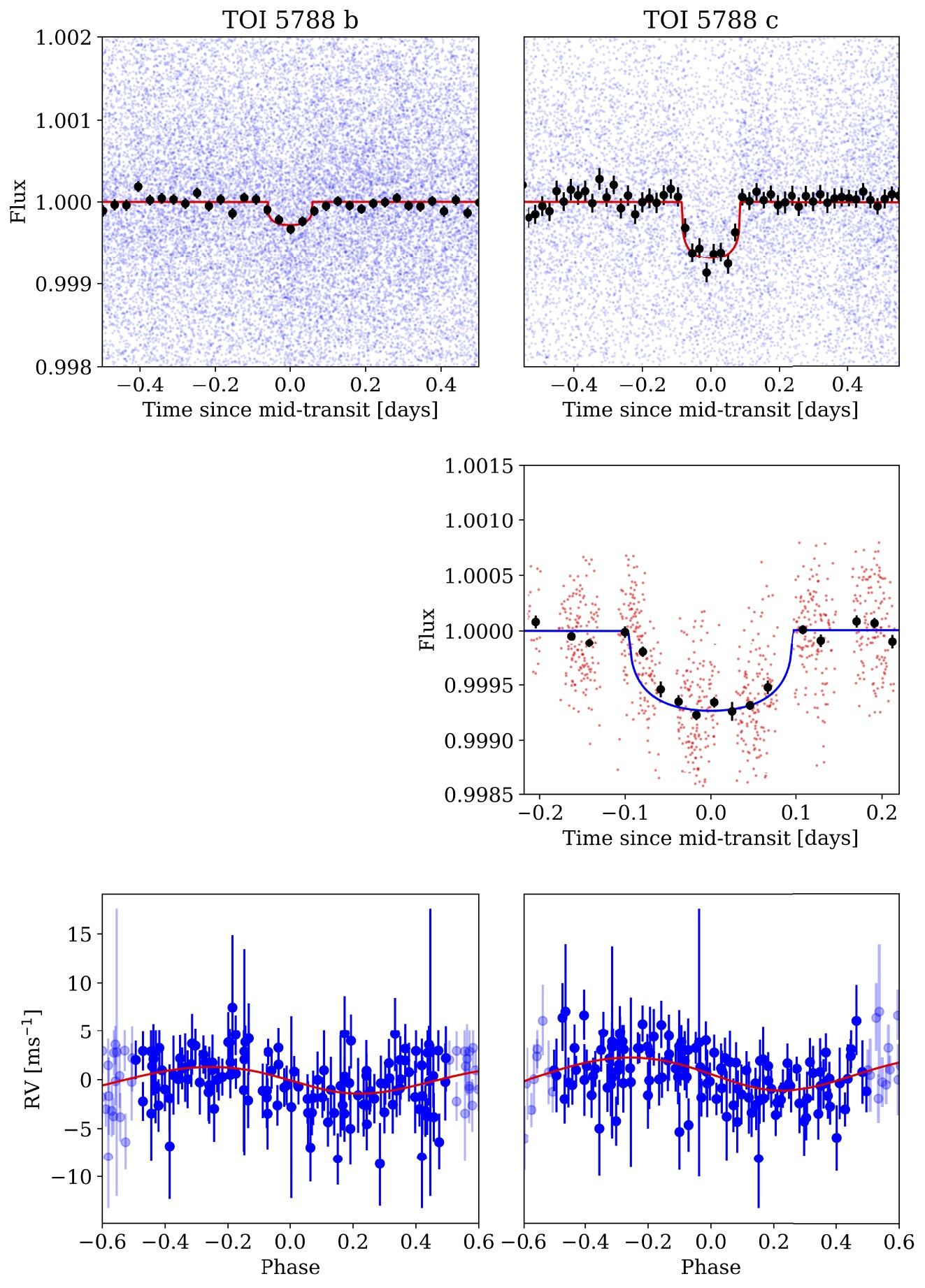
(Top) Phase-folded TESS transits light curves of TOI-5788 b and TOI-5788 c. (Middle) Phase-folded CHEOPS transit light curve of TOI-5788 c. (Bottom) The phase-folded radial velocity curves

In 2022, during its monitoring of the northern celestial hemisphere, TESS space telescope detected periodic dips in the brightness of the star TOI-5788. Analysis of the light curves revealed two transit signals with periods of 6.34 and 16.21 days. In 2023, the object was officially designated a TESS Object of Interest, abbreviated as TOI, and the planet candidates were named TOI-5788.01 and TOI-5788.02.

From 2024 to 2025, targeted observations were conducted by the European space telescope CHEOPS. As a result, the uncertainty in radius determination was minimized, with the radius of the first planet being 1.53 R🜨 and the radius of the second being 2.27 R🜨. This data allowed for the confirmation that the planets are on opposite sides of the "radius gap."

Concurrently, an intensive radial velocity observation campaign of the star was carried out using the HARPS-N spectrograph, installed on the Italian National Telescope Galileo. From 2023 to 2025, several dozen high-precision spectra of the star were obtained. Astronomers measured the shift in spectral lines caused by the star's motion at speeds of just a few meters per second. Through mathematical separation of the signals, their precise masses were calculated: 3.72 M🜨 for the first planet and 6.4 M🜨 for the second. With data on mass and radius, scientists were able to calculate the average density of the planets. This identified planet b as rocky and planet c as a mini-Neptune.

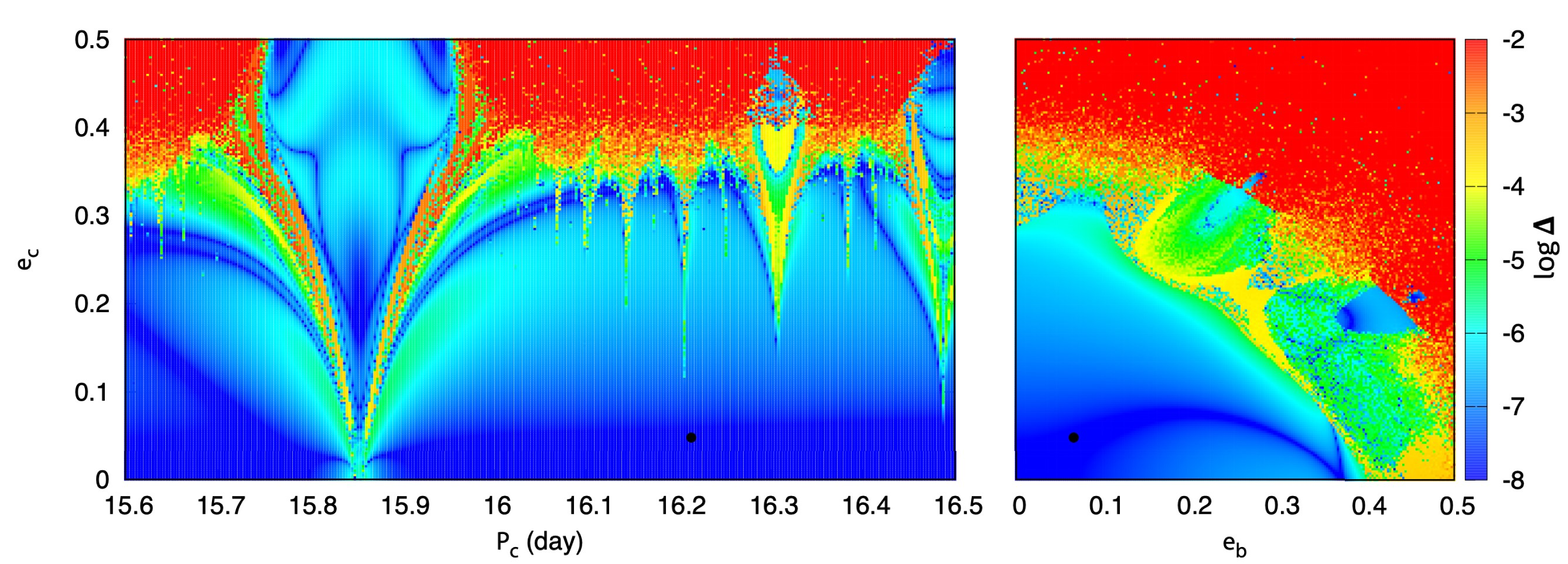
Stability analysis of the TOI-5788 planetary system

In the second half of 2025, a research group applied the Gaussian Process method. Computer simulations were performed, which showed that the planets' orbits are stable over a timescale of at least 1 billion years, despite their relative proximity to each other.

In January 2026, the exoplanets were officially confirmed.

The TOI-5788 planetary system
Companion (in order from star)	Mass	Semimajor axis (AU)	Orbital period (days)	Eccentricity	Inclination (°)	Radius
b	3.72±0.94 M_{🜨}	0.0640±0.0011	6.340758±0.000030	0.061+0.066 −0.042	87.94+0.26 −0.20	1.528±0.075 R_{🜨}
c	6.4±1.2 M_{🜨}	0.1197±0.0020	16.213362±0.000026	0.046+0.051 −0.032	89.60±0.25	2.272±0.039 R_{🜨}

== See also ==
- List of exoplanets discovered in 2026
