= TOI-201 =

Star in the constellation Pictor

Observation data Epoch J2000 Equinox ICRS
- Constellation: Pictor
- Right ascension: 05^{h} 49^{m} 36.4134^{s}
- Declination: −54° 54′ 38.555″
- Apparent magnitude (V): +9.715±0.079

Characteristics
- Evolutionary stage: main sequence
- Spectral type: F7V
- B−V color index: 0.534±0.019

Astrometry
Radial velocity (R_{v})	+17.51±0.03 km/s
Proper motion (μ)	RA: +8.032 mas/yr Dec.: +66.633 mas/yr
Parallax (π)	8.9141±0.0142 mas
Distance	365.9 ± 0.6 ly (112.2 ± 0.2 pc)

Details
Mass	1.32+0.02 −0.04 M_{☉}
Radius	1.31±0.01 R_{☉}
Luminosity	2.61±0.12 L_{☉}
Surface gravity (log g)	4.318±0.014 cgs
Temperature	6,423+86 −90 K
Metallicity [Fe/H]	+0.240±0.036 dex
Rotational velocity (v sin i)	9.52±0.28 km/s
Age	0.67+0.67 −0.44, 0.87+0.46 −0.49 Gyr

Other designations
- CD−54°1233, HD 39474, HIP 27515, SAO 234150, TYC 8524-391-1

Database references
SIMBAD	data
Exoplanet Archive	data

TOI-201 (HD 39474) is a star with two planets and a brown dwarf companion in the constellation Pictor. At an apparent magnitude of +9.715, it is not visible to the naked eye. Parallax measurements give a distance of 366 light-years (112.2 parsecs).

== Characteristics ==
The spectrum of this star matches a spectral class of F7V, with the luminosity class V indicating it is a main sequence star fusing atoms of hydrogen into helium at its core. The star's age is uncertain, estimated at 670+670
−440 or 870+460
−490 million years, but no more than 2.9 billion years. TOI-201 has 1.32 times the mass of the Sun and 1.31 times the Sun's radius. It radiates 2.61 times the Sun's luminosity from its photosphere at an effective temperature of 6,423 K. This temperature gives it the yellow-white hue typical of an F-type star.

No stellar companions have been detected by direct imaging within five arcseconds.

== Planetary system ==
Two candidate transiting planets were identified by the Transiting Exoplanet Survey Satellite. TOI-201 b, confirmed in 2021, is a Jupiter-sized planet orbiting with a period of roughly 53 days. TOI-201 d (initially called TOI-201 c before publication), confirmed in 2023, is a super-Earth with an orbital period of 5.85 days.

TOI-201 b is around 59% as massive as Jupiter, with a radius 101% that of Jupiter, giving it a density of 0.71 g/cm^{3}. Given the proximity to the host star, its equilibrium temperature is somewhat high, at 636 ± 10 K (362.9 ± 10.0 °C; 685.1 ± 18.0 °F). TOI-201 d has a radius 1.44 times that of Earth and a mass about 5.8 times that of Earth, implying a density of roughly 11 g/cm^{3}. The close proximity to its host star gives it an equilibrium temperature of 1,338 ± 15 K (1,064.8 ± 15.0 °C; 1,948.7 ± 27.0 °F).

A brown dwarf companion was described in 2025, initially detected through transit-timing variations of TOI-201 b, and later detected by radial velocity variations, as well as being found to be transiting the star. This body, named TOI-201 c, has a mass 16.5 times that of Jupiter, a radius 99% that of Jupiter, and a density of 21 g/cm^{3}. It is orbiting with a period of 2,881.15 days (7.8882 years), a semi-major axis of 4.33 astronomical units, and a high eccentricity of 0.622. It is the only known brown dwarf to be aligned with the host star's inner planetary system.

TOI-201 d appears to have formed isolatedly in the inner regions of the primordial gaseous disk, where it acquired a primordial atmosphere that may be no longer present due to photoevaporation. The two outer bodies may have formed in their current orbits, with TOI-201 b forming in a dense, inner disc. Alternatively, the brown dwarf TOI-201 c may have formed farther out and migrated inward, pumping its orbital eccentricity due to interactions with the primordial gas disk.

Due to the strong gravitational interactions between the three bodies and non-zero mutual inclinations, their orbits are changing in very short astronomical timescales. Within 200 years, the transiting nature of the three bodies will be over, then re-appearing after 10,000 years.

The TOI-201 planetary system
Companion (in order from star)	Mass	Semimajor axis (AU)	Orbital period (days)	Eccentricity	Inclination (°)	Radius
d	5.8±2.0 M_{🜨}	0.0677±0.0012	5.849240+0.000005 −0.000006	0.116+0.154 −0.084	87.54+0.68 −0.39	1.436+0.045 −0.046 R_{🜨}
b	0.59±0.02 M_{J}	0.3001±0.0031	52.97804+0.00004 −0.00002	0.275±0.002	88.855+0.001 −0.003	1.01±0.03 R_{J}
c	16.46±0.48 M_{J}	4.33±0.06	2881.15+0.02 −0.01	0.622±0.001	89.855±0.001	0.99±0.03 R_{J}
