= TOI-791 =

Star system in the constellation Volans

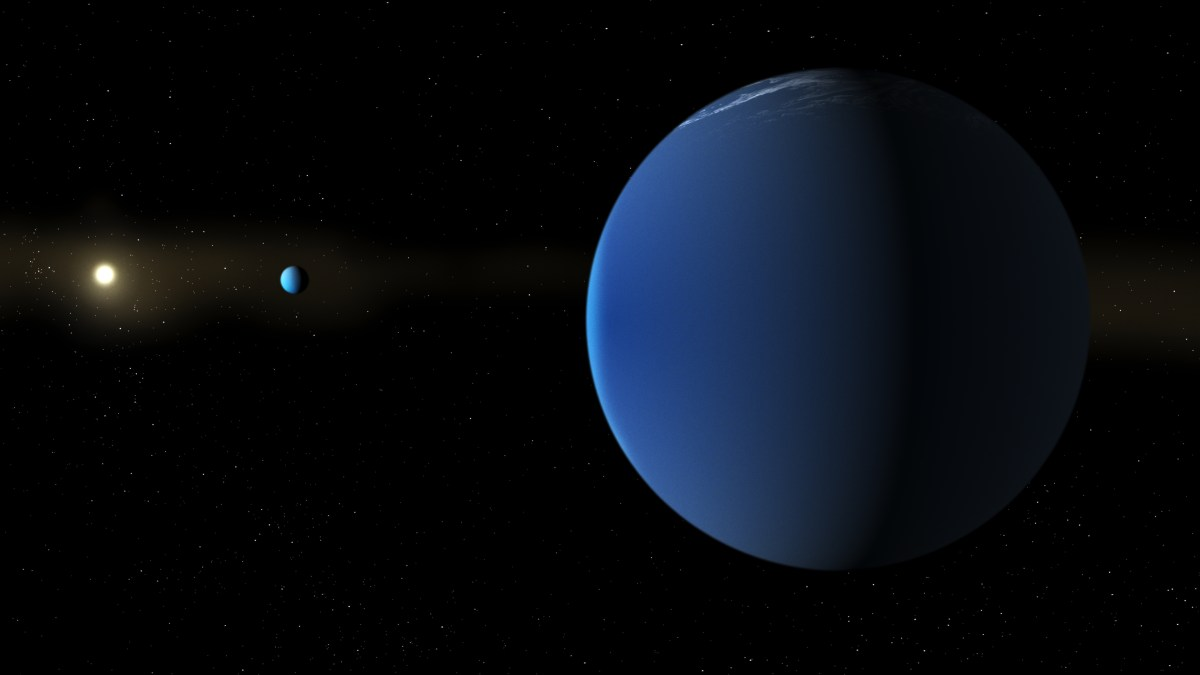
- Artistic representation of TOI-791 system

Observation data Epoch J2000 Equinox ICRS
- Constellation: Volans
- Right ascension: 07^{h} 53^{m} 44.36^{s}
- Declination: −69° 42′ 06.4″
- Apparent magnitude (V): 11.09±0.07

Characteristics
- Evolutionary stage: Main-sequence
- Spectral type: F4V

Astrometry
Radial velocity (R_{v})	+6.24±0.95 km/s
Proper motion (μ)	RA: −5.139±0.015 mas/yr Dec.: +8.285±0.017 mas/yr
Parallax (π)	2.9719±0.0128 mas
Distance	1,097 ± 5 ly (336 ± 1 pc)

Details
Mass	1.43 M_{☉}
Radius	1.43 R_{☉}
Luminosity	3.77 L_{☉}
Surface gravity (log g)	4.28 cgs
Temperature	6,727 K
Metallicity [Fe/H]	–0.14 dex

Other designations
- TOI-791, TIC 306472057, TYC 9184-1675-1, GSC 09184-01675, 2MASS J07534434-6942063, Gaia DR3 5270467966514084224

Database references
SIMBAD	data

TOI-791 is an F-type main-sequence star located approximately 1,113 light-years from Earth in the constellation of Volans. At a visual apparent magnitude of 11.1, it is too faint to be seen with the naked eye. It has 1.43 times the Solar mass and 1.43 times the Solar radius while its [Fe/H] metallicity index is about −0.14, indicating an iron-to-hydrogen ratio 72% that of the Sun. It hosts two known transiting exoplanets.

== Planetary system ==
In 2026, using the transit method, two giant planets were confirmed around TOI-791, which had been previously identified as candidates from TESS. The inner planet TOI-791 b has orbital period of 139 days while the outer TOI-791 c has orbital period of 232 days. Based on the transit-timing-variation (TTV) phenomenon, the masses and densities of both planets can be measured, indicating that these planets are super-puffs with the lowest densities among all known exoplanets. The discovery and follow-up studies of TOI-791 b and TOI-791 c might give insights into how super-puff planets form and evolve.

The TOI-791 planetary system
Companion (in order from star)	Mass	Semimajor axis (AU)	Orbital period (days)	Eccentricity	Inclination (°)	Radius
b	0.030±0.005 M_{J}	0.602±0.022	139.29931^{+0.00011}_{−0.00012}	0.032^{+0.014}_{−0.032}	89.797±0.039	0.993±0.033 R_{J}
c	0.058±0.007 M_{J}	0.863±0.032	232.01570^{+0.00067}_{−0.00071}	0.028^{+0.013}_{−0.028}	89.695±0.013	1.155±0.040 R_{J}

== See also ==
- List of exoplanet extremes
- List of stars in Volans
