= TOI-4468 =

Star

Observation data Epoch J2000.0 Equinox ICRS
- Constellation: Draco
- Right ascension: 17^{h} 22^{m} 18.02979^{s}
- Declination: +72° 38′ 43.4211″
- Apparent magnitude (V): 14.0

Characteristics
- Evolutionary stage: Main sequence
- Spectral type: K

Astrometry
Radial velocity (R_{v})	−19.14±2.43 km/s
Proper motion (μ)	RA: −7.005 mas/yr Dec.: −5.103 mas/yr
Parallax (π)	2.6450±0.0134 mas
Distance	1,233 ± 6 ly (378 ± 2 pc)

Details
Mass	0.805+0.042 −0.038 M_{☉}
Radius	0.771+0.020 −0.018 R_{☉}
Luminosity	0.381+0.036 −0.029 L_{☉}
Surface gravity (log g)	4.571+0.020 −0.022 cgs
Temperature	5170+120 −110 K
Metallicity [Fe/H]	−0.03±0.16 dex
Age	7.4+3.9 −3.6 Gyr

Other designations
- TOI-4468, TIC 441763252

Database references
SIMBAD	data
Exoplanet Archive	data

TOI-4468 is a star. It is smaller than the Sun with about 80.5% the mass, and 77.1% the radius. It is located approximately 1233 light years from Earth. TOI-4468 is a single star in the constellation Draco. It is 7.4 billion years old, much older than the Sun's 4.5 billion years. TOI-4468's spectral type is unknown, although its lifespan is likely to be that of a K-type star because of its size and mass.

When TOI-4468 was observed in August 2026 no nearby stars were detected.

== Planetary system ==
In August 2026, two planets were discovered in its orbit: TOI-4468 b, a hot Jupiter on a three-day orbit and a close outer companion, TOI-4468 c, with a seven-day orbit. They were both identified using radial velocity and transit methods. The researchers could not rule out the presence of closer planets closer, although any such planets would be smaller than Earth. The study also detected a 624-day signal, which could be caused by either an additional planet or a star.

The TOI-4468 planetary system
Companion (in order from star)	Mass	Semimajor axis (AU)	Orbital period (days)	Eccentricity	Inclination (°)	Radius
b	170.1+9.7 −8.8 M_{🜨}	0.03592+0.00060 −0.00057	2.77085931(36)	0.030+0.026 −0.020	89.35+0.44 −0.49	11.29+0.31 −0.28 R_{🜨}
c	11.1+4.0 −2.6 (Note: This is a prediction based on mass-radius relationships; the planet's mass has not been measured.) M_{🜨}	0.0667±0.0011	7.013900(20)	0.122+0.16 −0.083	88.95+0.66 −0.50	3.09+0.14 −0.12 R_{🜨}
.03 (unconfirmed)	≥0.98 M_{J}	1.332+0.079 −0.061	624+53 −38	—	—	—
