= HD 114386 =

Star in the constellation Centaurus

Observation data Epoch J2000 Equinox ICRS
- Constellation: Centaurus
- Right ascension: 13^{h} 10^{m} 39.824^{s}
- Declination: −35° 03′ 17.21″
- Apparent magnitude (V): 8.73

Characteristics
- Evolutionary stage: main sequence
- Spectral type: K3 V
- B−V color index: 0.982

Astrometry
Radial velocity (R_{v})	33.350±0.0004 km/s
Proper motion (μ)	RA: −137.143 mas/yr Dec.: −324.874 mas/yr
Parallax (π)	35.7355±0.0200 mas
Distance	91.27 ± 0.05 ly (27.98 ± 0.02 pc)
Absolute magnitude (M_{V})	6.43

Details
Mass	0.76±0.01 M_{☉}
Radius	0.73±0.01 R_{☉}
Luminosity	0.28±0.01 L_{☉}
Surface gravity (log g)	4.58±0.02 cgs
Temperature	4,926±13 K
Metallicity [Fe/H]	−0.012 dex
Rotational velocity (v sin i)	3.06 km/s
Age	8.8±2.8 Gyr

Other designations
- CD−34°8698, HD 114386, HIP 64295, SAO 204193, PPM 291056, LTT 5041, NLTT 33118

Database references
SIMBAD	data
Exoplanet Archive	data

HD 114386 is a star with a pair of orbiting exoplanets in the southern constellation of Centaurus. It has an apparent visual magnitude of 8.73, which means it cannot be viewed with the naked eye but can be seen with a telescope or good binoculars. Based on parallax measurements, the system is located at a distance of 91 light-years from the Sun. It is receding with a radial velocity of 33.4 km/s. The star shows a high proper motion, traversing the celestial sphere at an angular rate of 0.318 arcsec yr^{−1}.

The spectrum of HD 114386 yields a stellar classification of K3 V, matching a K-type main-sequence star, or orange dwarf. It has 76% of the mass of the Sun and 73% of the Sun's radius. HD 114386 is a much older star than the Sun with an estimated age of roughly nine billion years. The abundance of iron in the stellar atmosphere, a measure of the star's metallicity, is nearly solar. It is rather dim compared to the Sun, radiating just 28% of the luminosity of the Sun from its photosphere at an effective temperature of 4,926 K.

== Planetary system ==
In 2004, the Geneva Extrasolar Planet Search Team announced the discovery of an exoplanet orbiting the star by the radial velocity method. The preliminary data for a second, inner, exoplanet was released in 2011; it was confirmed in 2026. The inclination and true mass of the outer planet have been determined by astrometry.

The HD 114386 planetary system
Companion (in order from star)	Mass	Semimajor axis (AU)	Orbital period (days)	Eccentricity	Inclination (°)	Radius
c	≥0.37±0.03 M_{J}	1.05+0.04 −0.04	444.00+0.93 −0.88	0.10±0.03	—	—
b	1.46+0.37 −0.22 M_{J}	1.86+0.07 −0.08	1049.4+1.5 −1.2	0.02±0.01	57+22 −15	—

== See also ==
- 47 Ursae Majoris
- Lists of planets
